= Genocides in history (1490 to 1914) =

Overview of genocides before 1914

Genocide is the intentional destruction of a people (Note: Defined under the Genocide Convention as "national, ethnical, racial, or religious group.") in whole or in part. The term was coined in 1944 by Raphael Lemkin. It is defined in Article 2 of the Convention on the Prevention and Punishment of the Crime of Genocide (CPPCG) of 1948 as "any of the following acts committed with intent to destroy, in whole or in part, a national, ethnical, racial, or religious group, as such: killing members of the group; causing serious bodily or mental harm to members of the group; deliberately inflicting on the group conditions of life calculated to bring about its physical destruction in whole or in part; imposing measures intended to prevent births within the group; [and] forcibly transferring children of the group to another group."

The preamble to the CPPCG states that "genocide is a crime under international law, contrary to the spirit and aims of the United Nations and condemned by the civilized world", and it also states that "at all periods of history genocide has inflicted great losses on humanity." Genocide is widely considered to be the epitome of human evil, and has been referred to as the "crime of crimes". The Political Instability Task Force estimated that 43 genocides occurred between 1956 and 2016, resulting in 50 million deaths. The UNHCR estimated that a further 50 million had been displaced by such episodes of violence.

== Definitions of genocide ==
The debate continues over what legally constitutes genocide. One definition is any conflict that the International Criminal Court has so designated. Mohammed Hassan Kakar argues that the definition should include political groups or any group so defined by the perpetrator. He prefers the definition from Frank Chalk and Kurt Jonassohn, which defines genocide as "a form of one-sided mass killing in which a state or other authority intends to destroy a group so defined by the perpetrator."

In literature, some scholars have popularly emphasized the role that the Soviet Union played in excluding political groups from the international definition of genocide, which is contained in the Genocide Convention of 1948, and in particular they have written that Joseph Stalin may have feared greater international scrutiny of the political killings that occurred in the country, such as the Great Purge; however, this claim is not supported by evidence. The Soviet view was shared and supported by many diverse countries, and they were also in line with Raphael Lemkin's original conception, (Note: By 1951, Lemkin was saying that the Soviet Union was the only state that could be indicted for genocide; his concept of genocide, as it was outlined in Axis Rule in Occupied Europe, covered Stalinist deportations as genocide by default, and differed from the adopted Genocide Convention in many ways. From a 21st-century perspective, its coverage was very broad, and as a result, it would classify almost any gross human rights violation as a genocide, and many events that were deemed genocidal by Lemkin did not amount to genocide under the convention. As the Cold War began, this change was the result of Lemkin's turn to anti-communism in an attempt to convince the United States to ratify the Genocide Convention.) and it was originally promoted by the World Jewish Congress.

== Africa ==
=== Atlantic Slave Trade ===
The transatlantic slave trade resulted in a vast and as yet unknown loss of life for African captives both in and outside the Americas. Estimates have ranged from as low as 2 million to as high as 60 million. Patrick Manning estimates that about 12 million slaves entered the Atlantic trade between the 16th and 19th centuries, but about 1.5 million died on board ship. About 10.5 million slaves arrived in the Americas. Besides the slaves who died on the Middle Passage, more Africans likely died during the slave raids and wars in Africa and forced marches to ports. Manning estimates that 4 million died inside Africa after capture, and many more died young. Manning's estimate covers the 12 million who were originally destined for the Atlantic, as well as the 6 million destined for Arabian slave markets and the 8 million destined for African markets. Of the slaves shipped to the Americas, the largest share went to Brazil and the Caribbean.

Canadian scholar Adam Jones characterises the mass death of millions of Africans during the Atlantic slave trade as a genocide. He calls it "one of the worst holocausts in human history" because it resulted in 15 to 20 million deaths (according to one estimate). In contrast to arguments that "it was in slave owners' interest to keep slaves alive, not exterminate them", which he calls "mostly sophistry", he argues:

The killing and destruction were intentional, whatever the incentives to preserve survivors of the Atlantic passage for labor exploitation ... If an institution is deliberately maintained and expanded by discernible agents, though all are aware of the hecatombs of casualties it is inflicting on a definable human group, then why should this not qualify as genocide?

=== Cape Colony ===
From circa 1770 until 1880, the Cape San people were subjected to a range of actions that led to "the virtual extinction of the Cape San peoples". These actions included land expropriation, massacres known as "Bushmen hunting", forced labor, and abduction of women and children at the hands of Dutch settlers called trekboers and the paramilitary groups that they formed.

The dynamic of violence was characterised by trekboer encroachment on the frontier of the Dutch Cape Colony expelling San people, the San retaliating and subsequent spirals of trekboer retribution culminating in raids by trekboer commandos. The violence also took place in a context of deeply racist perceptions of the San people as barely human, "a wild animal to be shot at sight". From about 1770 until the end of the 1790s, these commandos happened on an annual basis, took a distinct exterminatory character and involved killing men on the spot, while women and children were either killed or taken captive. On 5 June 1777, the Dutch East India Company authorities in Cape Town for the first time endorsed these annihilation practices, giving official sanction to violence which they had previously been unable to restrain.

When Britain took control of the Cape Colony, first in 1795, then again in 1806, they took several steps to shift towards a policy of assimilation, but failed at stopping settler violence against the San. Commando raids continued, although the ratio of San people killed versus taken captive was inverted compared to the late 18th century. Along the Northeastern frontier of the Cape Colony, the Cape San were increasingly integrated as labour into the economy of white farms and along the Northern frontier, the subsistence of those still living according to their foraging lifestyle became increasingly precarious, with starvation a frequent occurrence in times of drought. After a series of massacres in the 1850s and 1860s, and the participation of San in the ǃKora Wars of 1868–1869 and 1878–1879, the independent existence of San society in "Bushmanland" and along the frontier of the colony was essentially extinct.

=== Congo ===
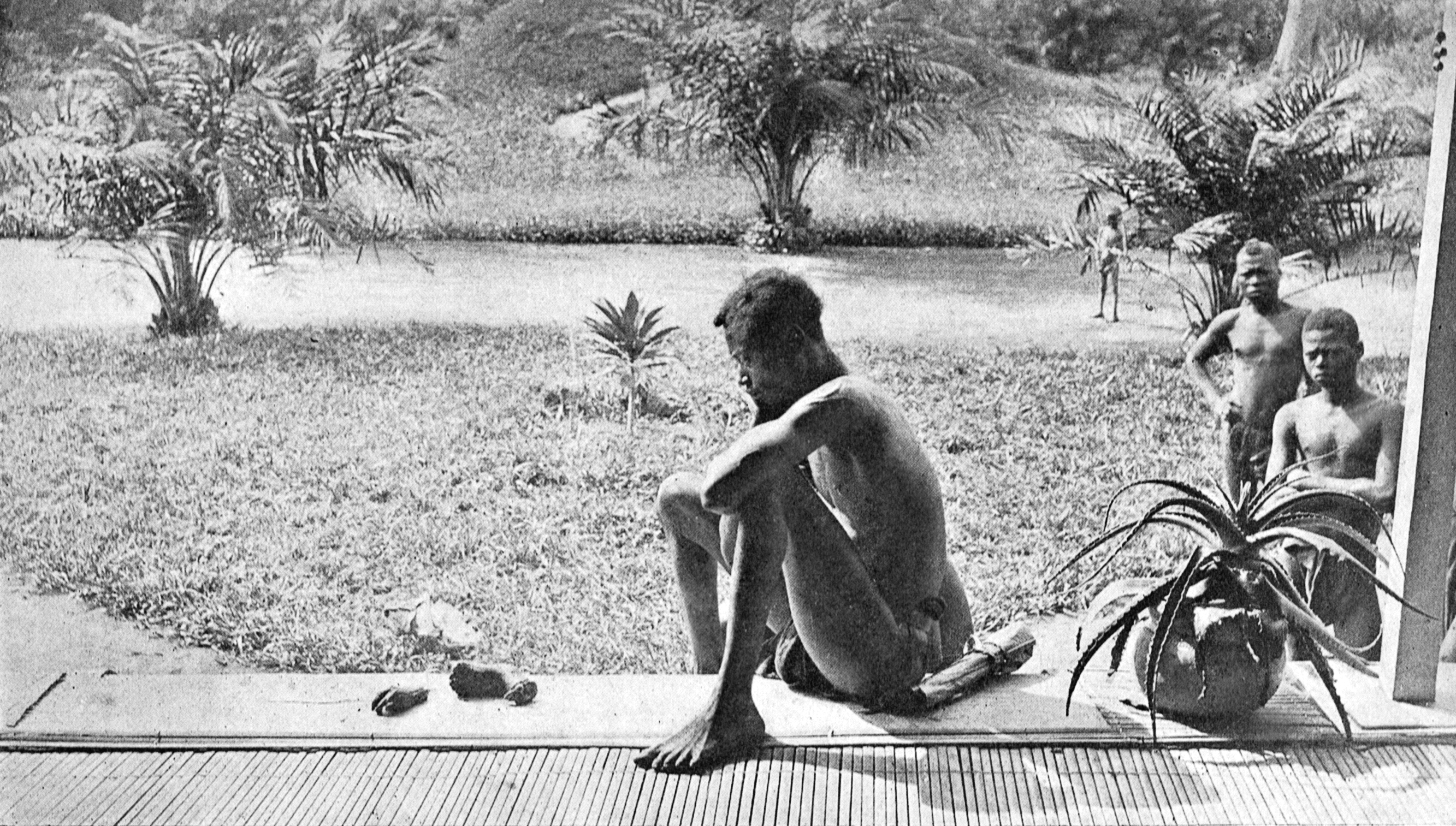
A Congolese man, Nsala, looking at the severed hand and foot of his five-year-old daughter who in 1904 was killed, cooked, and cannibalized by armed guards of a company holding a concession for rubber collection. The photo was taken by Alice Seely Harris.

From 1885 to 1908, the Congo Free State in central Africa was privately controlled by Leopold II, the second King of the Belgians from the House of Saxe-Coburg and Gotha, who extracted a fortune from the land by the use of forced labour of natives. Under his regime, there were 2 to 15 million deaths among the Congolese people. Deliberate killings, abusive punishments, and general exploitation were major causes of the deaths. As in the colonisation of the Americas, European diseases, hitherto unknown in the region, also led to a considerable number of deaths. Because the main motive for the killings was financial gain, it has been debated whether the term genocide describes these atrocities well. The journalist Adam Hochschild, writing in King Leopold's Ghost, stated that the level of killing in the Congo was of a "genocidal proportion", but did not consider it a genocide as, according to Hochschild, King Leopold's aim was not the extermination of the Congolese people.

Raphael Lemkin considered the crimes in the Congo to be an unambiguous case of genocide. Robert Weisbord wrote in the Journal of Genocide Research in 2003 that attempting to eliminate a portion of the population is enough to qualify as genocide under the UN convention, this has more recently been supported by historian Dean Pavlakis, who argues that the atrocities in the Congo Free State meet the requisite criteria of the UN Genocide Convention. Reports of the atrocities led to a major international scandal in the early 20th century, and Leopold was ultimately forced in 1908 by the Belgian government to relinquish control of the colony to the civil administration.

=== Ethiopia under Menelik II (1889–1913) ===
During its military conquests, its centralisation of its power and its incorporation of territories into Ethiopia as decreed by Menelik II, his army committed genocidal atrocities against civilians and combatants which included torture, mass killings and the imposition of mass slavery. Large-scale atrocities were also committed against the Dizi people and the people of the Kaficho kingdom. Some estimates of the number of people who were killed in the atrocities that were committed during the war and the famine which coincided with it go into the millions. According to Alexander Bulatovich, Menelik's Russian military aide, Menelik's armies "dreadfully annihilated more than half" of the Oromo (Galla) population down to 5 million people, which "took away from the Galla all possibility of thinking about any sort of uprising." Eshete Gemeda put the death toll even higher at 6 million.

These deaths may have also been caused by the great famine, which lasted from 1888 to 1892 and was the worst famine in the region's history; a third of Ethiopia's total population of 12 million was killed according to some estimates. The famine was caused by rinderpest, an infectious viral cattle disease which wiped out most of the national livestock, killing over 90% of the cattle. The population of native cattle had no prior exposure to the disease and as a result, it was unable to fight it off. Despite the violence of the conquest, some historians stress the fact that before the centralisation process was completed, Ethiopia was devastated by numerous wars which started in the 16th century. In the intervening period, military tactics had not changed much. In the 16th century, the Portuguese Bermudes documented depopulation and widespread atrocities against civilians and combatants (atrocities which included torture, mass killings and the imposition of large scale slavery) during several successive Aba Gedas' Gadaa conquests of territories which were located north of the Genale river (Bali, Amhara, Gafat, Damot, Adal). Warfare in the region essentially involved acquiring cattle and slaves, winning additional territories, gaining control of trade routes and carrying out ritual requirements or securing trophies to prove masculinity. Wars were fought between people who might be members of the same linguistic group, religion and culture, or between unrelated tribes. Centralisation greatly reduced these continuous wars; minimising the loss of lives, raids, destruction and slavery that had previously been the norm.

=== French conquest of Algeria ===
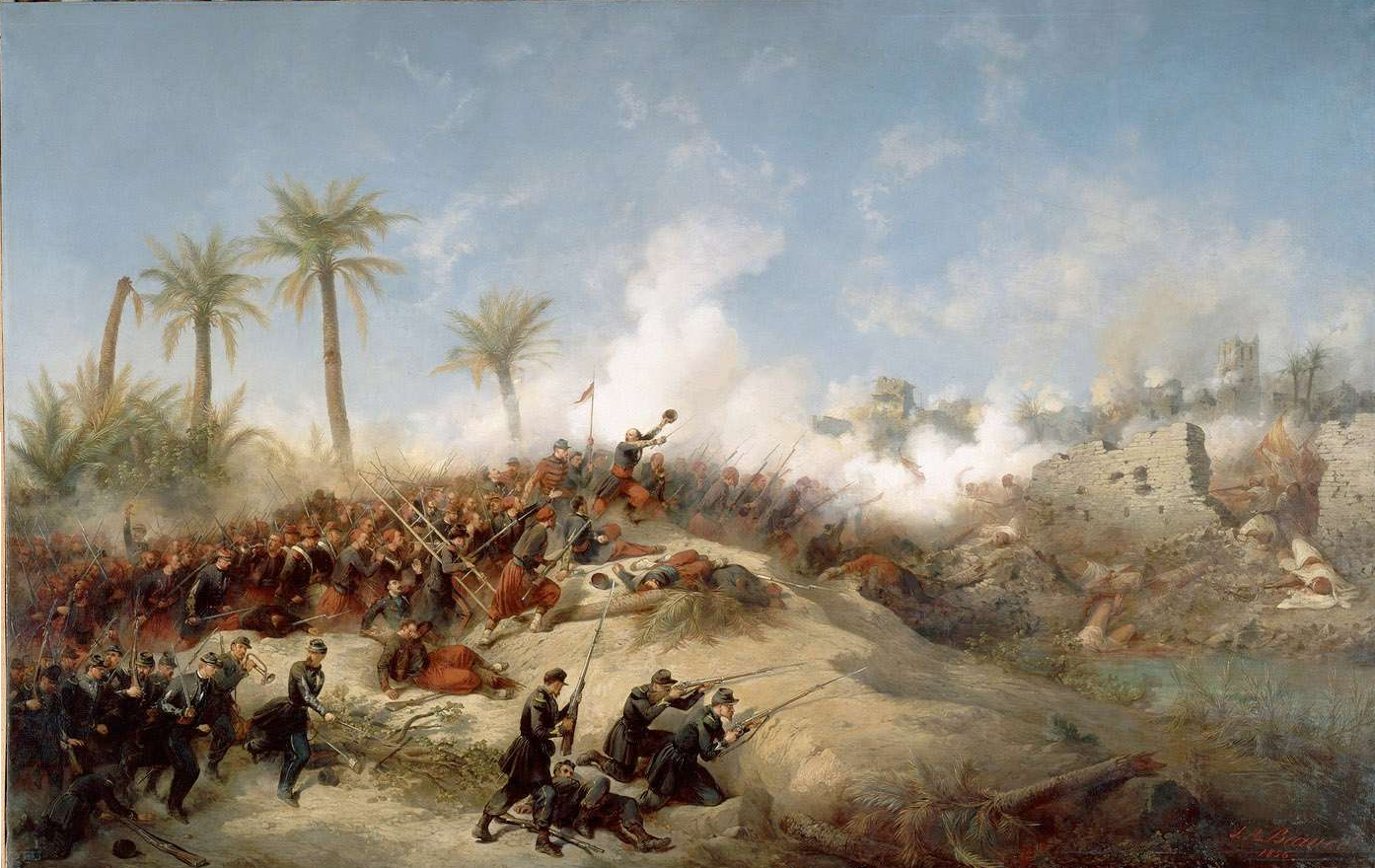
Storming of Zaatcha (1849) by Jean-Adolphe Beaucé

Ben Kiernan wrote in his book Blood and Soil: A World History of Genocide and Extermination from Sparta to Darfur on the French conquest of Algeria, that within three decades of the French conquest of Algeria in 1830, war, genocidal massacres, and famine had reduced the original population from 3 million by a figure ranging from 500,000 to 1,000,000.

By 1875, the French conquest was complete. The war had killed approximately 825,000 indigenous Algerians since 1830. A long shadow of genocidal hatred persisted, provoking a French author to protest in 1882 that in Algeria, "we hear it repeated every day that we must expel the native and if necessary destroy him." As a French statistical journal urged five years later, "the system of extermination must give way to a policy of penetration."

Historian William Gallois argues that using a variety of frameworks, the conquest of Algeria should be considered a case of genocide.

In response to France's recognition of Armenian genocide, Turkey accused France of committing genocide against 15% of Algeria's population.

=== German East Africa ===
The Maji Maji Rebellion (German: Maji-Maji-Aufstand, Swahili: Vita vya Maji Maji), was an armed rebellion of Africans against German colonial rule in German East Africa. The war was triggered by German colonial policies which were designed to force the indigenous population to grow cotton for export. The war lasted from 1905 to 1907, during which 75,000 to 300,000 died, overwhelmingly from famine. The end of the war was followed by a period of famine, known as the Great Hunger (ukame), caused in large part by the scorched-earth policies used by governor von Götzen to suppress the rebellion. These tactics have been described by scholars as genocidal.

=== German South West Africa ===
Head of a Shark Island concentration camp prisoner, which was used by German Empire doctors for medical experiments.

Identified as the first genocide of the 20th century, the Herero and Nama peoples of present-day Namibia endured a genocidal persecution between 1904 and 1907 while their homeland was under colonial rule as German South West Africa. Large percentages of their populations perished in a brutal scorched earth campaign led by German General Lothar von Trotha. An estimated 10,000 Nama were killed, with estimates for the Herero ranging from 60,000 and 100,000. Historian Leonor Faber-Jonker highlights how genocidal violence in German South-West Africa was built up to with ever more exterminatory wars during the late 19th century.

Beginning as an insurrection against German colonial rule, the Herero Wars almost immediately developed into a genocide of the indigenous insurrectionists, with Trotha issuing his Extermination Order in October 1904, a copy of which survives in the Botswana National Archives. The order states "every Herero, with or without a gun, with or without cattle, will be shot. I will no longer accept women or children, I will drive them back to their people [to die in the desert] or let them be shot at." Olusoga and Erichsen write: "It is an almost unique document: an explicit, written declaration of intent to commit genocide." Trotha further explained that the German response to the indigenous insurrection "is and remains the beginning of a racial struggle".

Many of those not killed were moved to concentration camps, such as Shark Island, after the destruction of their villages, where many succumbed to starvation. These concentration camps were also the location of medical experiments by German eugenicists such as Eugen Fischer.

=== Zulu Kingdom under Shaka Zulu ===
Between 1810 and 1828, the Zulu kingdom under Shaka Zulu and Dingane laid waste to large parts of present-day South Africa and Zimbabwe. Frequently, Zulu armies not only aimed to defeat their enemies, they aimed to totally destroy them. Those who were exterminated included prisoners of war, children and even dogs. Until the 1990s and early 2000s the academic literature attributed the cause of the Mfecane to Shaka's expansionist policies, however scholars now view the Mfecane as having been caused by factors predating the founding of the Zulu kingdom, namely the interplay of pre-existing trends of political centralization with the effects of international trade, environmental instability, and European colonization. Estimates of the death toll during the Mfecane range from 1 million to 2 million.

== Americas ==
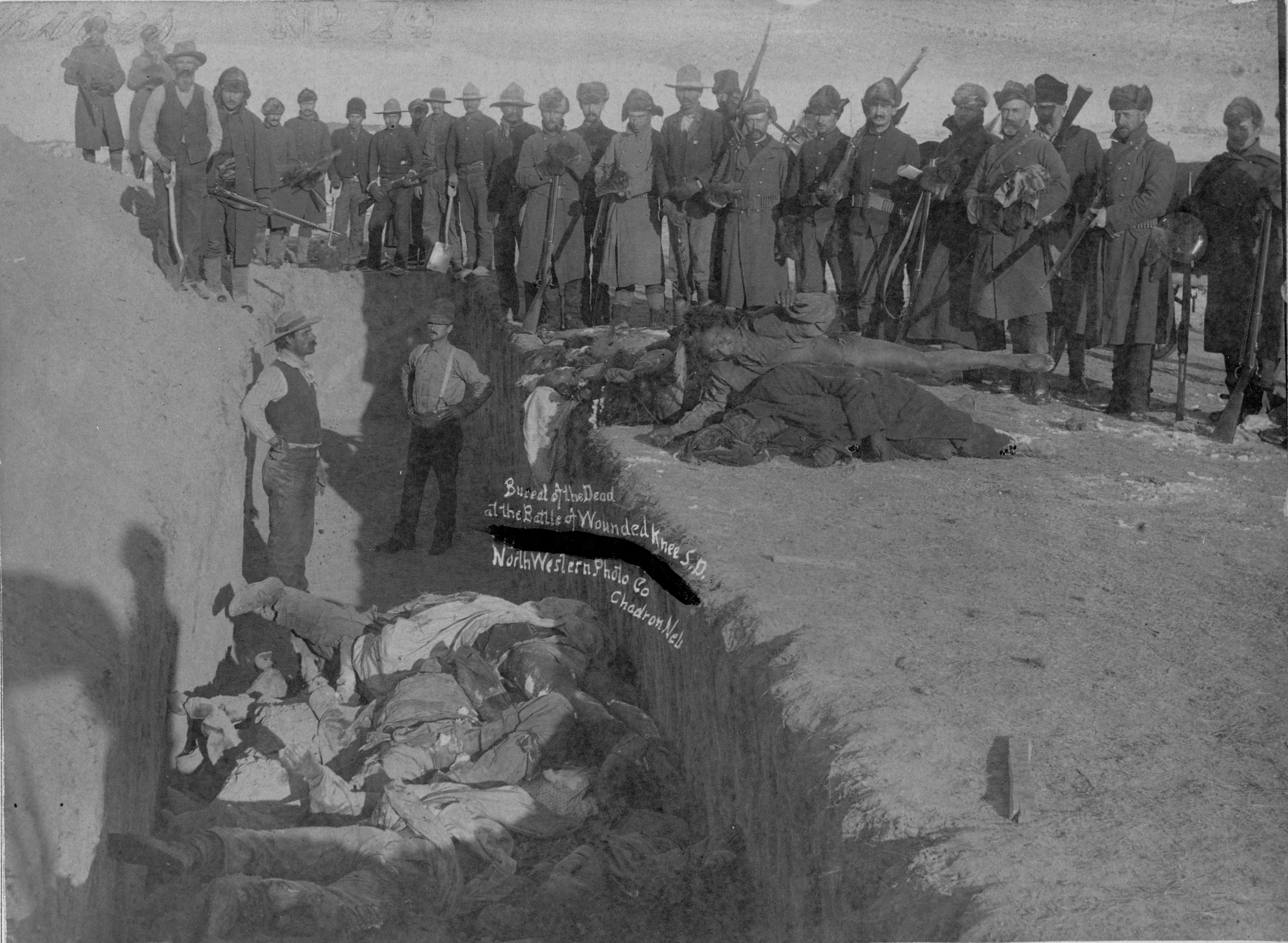
Mass grave burial of Native Americans at the Wounded Knee massacre in 1890

According to The Cambridge World History, the Oxford Handbook of Genocide Studies, and the Cambridge World History of Genocide, colonial policies in some cases included the deliberate genocide of indigenous peoples in North America. According to Harald E. Braun, Spanish colonisation of the Americas also included genocidal massacres.

According to historian David Stannard, over the course of more than four centuries "from the 1490s into the 1890s, Europeans and white Americans engaged in an unbroken string of genocide campaigns against the native peoples of the Americas." Stannard writes that the native population had been reduced savagely by invasions of European plague and violence and that by around 1900 only one-third of one percent of America's population—250,000 out of 76,000,000 people–were natives. He calls it "the worst human holocaust the world had ever witnessed", and it leveled off because "there was, at last, almost no one left to kill." On 20 January 1513, Vasco Núñez de Balboa wrote to the king advocating genocide against the native population in the Caribbean. Balboa slew hundreds in Caribbean villages. The crown later withdrew support and Balboa was executed in 1519.

Raphael Lemkin considered colonial abuses of the Native population of the Americas to constitute cultural and even outright genocide including the abuses of the Encomienda system. He described slavery as "cultural genocide par excellence" noting "it is the most effective and thorough method of destroying culture, of desocialising human beings." He considers colonists guilty due to failing to halt the abuses of the system despite royal orders. He also notes the sexual abuse by Spanish colonisers of Native women as acts of "biological genocide." In this vein, Stannard described the encomienda as a genocidal system which "had driven many millions of native peoples in Central and South America to early and agonising deaths."

Anthropologist Jason Hickel asserts that during Spanish rule of Hispaniola, many Arawaks died from lethal forced labour in the mines, in which a third of workers died every six months and that within two years of the arrival of Christopher Columbus half the population of Hispaniola had been killed. According to anthropologist Russell Thornton, for the American Indians "the arrival of the Europeans marked the beginning of a long holocaust, although it came not in ovens, as it did for the Jews. The fires that consumed North America Indians were the fevers brought on by newly encountered diseases, the flashes of settlers' and soldiers' guns, the ravages of 'firewater,' the flames of villages and fields burned by the scorched-earth policy of vengeful Euro-Americans." Some authors, including Holocaust scholar David Cesarani, have argued that United States government policies in furtherance of its so-called Manifest Destiny constituted genocide.

Some historians disagree that genocide, defined as a crime of intent, should be used to describe the colonisation experience. Stafford Poole, a research historian, wrote: "There are other terms to describe what happened in the Western Hemisphere, but genocide is not one of them. It is a good propaganda term in an age where slogans and shouting have replaced reflection and learning, but to use it in this context is to cheapen both the word itself and the appalling experiences of the Jews and Armenians, to mention but two of the major victims of this century." Noble David Cook, writing about the Black Legend and the conquest of the Americas, wrote that "there were too few Spaniards to have killed the millions who were reported to have died in the first century after Old and New World contact". He instead estimates that the death toll was caused by diseases like smallpox, which according to some estimates had an 80–90% fatality rate in Native American populations. Political scientist Guenter Lewy says "even if up to 90 percent of the reduction in Indian population was the result of disease, that leaves a sizable death toll caused by mistreatment and violence"; however, he rejected calling it genocide stating that

the sad fate of America's Indians represents not a crime but a tragedy, involving an irreconcilable collision of cultures and values. Despite the efforts of well-meaning people in both camps, there existed no good solution to this clash. The Indians were not prepared to give up the nomadic life of the hunter for the sedentary life of the farmer. The new Americans, convinced of their cultural and racial superiority, were unwilling to grant the original inhabitants of the continent the vast preserve of land required by the Indians' way of life. The consequence was a conflict in which there were few heroes, but which was far from a simple tale of hapless victims and merciless aggressors. To fling the charge of genocide at an entire society serves neither the interests of the Indians nor those of history.

Historian Roxanne Dunbar-Ortiz opposes these viewpoints and says, "Proponents of the default position emphasise attrition by disease despite other causes equally deadly, if not more so. In doing so they refuse to accept that the colonisation of America was genocidal by plan, not simply the tragic fate of populations lacking immunity to disease. In the case of the Jewish Holocaust, no one denies that more Jews died of starvation, overwork, and disease under Nazi incarceration than died in gas ovens, yet the acts of creating and maintaining the conditions that led to those deaths clearly constitute genocide."

Historian Andrés Reséndez argues that even though the Spanish were aware of the spread of smallpox, they made no mention of it until 1519, a quarter century after Columbus arrived in Hispaniola. Instead he contends that enslavement in gold and silver mines was the primary reason why the Native American population of Hispaniola dropped so significantly. and that even though disease was a factor, the native population would have rebounded the same way Europeans did following the Black Death if it were not for the constant enslavement they were subject to. He contends that enslavement of Native Americans was one of the causes of their depopulation in North America; that the majority of the Native Americans enslaved were women and children compared to the enslavement of Africans which mostly targeted adult males and in turn they were sold at a 50% to 60% higher price, and that 2,462,000 to 4,985,000 Native Americans were enslaved between Columbus's arrival and 1900 throughout the Americas. (Note: Reséndez estimates between 2.462 and 4.985 million indigenous people were enslaved.)

Several films and books on the subject were released around the year 1992 to coincide with the 500th anniversary of Columbus' voyage. In 2003, Venezuelan president Hugo Chávez urged Latin Americans not to celebrate the Columbus Day holiday. Chavez blamed Columbus for spearheading "the biggest invasion and genocide ever seen in the history of humanity."

According to scientists from University College London, the colonisation of the Americas caused so much disease and death in the 100 years after 1492, that it contributed to climate change and global cooling. The depopulation caused the abandonment and reforestation of large areas of farmland, resulting in large enough decreases in carbon dioxide to cool the earth.

=== Argentina ===
The Conquest of the Desert was a military campaign mainly directed by General Julio Argentino Roca in the 1870s, which established Argentine dominance over Patagonia, then inhabited by indigenous peoples, killing more than 1,300.

Contemporary sources indicate that it was a deliberate genocide by the Argentine government, with Argentine troops committing mass executions, reports of nations being "wiped out of existence", and those not killed were often deported from Patagonia. Others perceived the campaign as intending to suppress only groups of indigenous people that refused to submit to the government and carried out attacks on European settlements.

=== Argentina and Chile ===
The Selknam genocide was the systematic extermination of the Selkʼnam people, one of the four indigenous peoples of Tierra del Fuego archipelago, in the late 19th and early 20th centuries. Historians estimate that the genocide spanned a period of between ten and twenty years, and resulted in the decline of the Selkʼnam population from approximately 4,000 people during the 1880s to a few hundred by the early 1900s.

=== Canada ===
==== Ontario ====
As part of the broader Beaver Wars, between 1640 and 1649, among the Indigenous peoples in Canada, the Iroquois conducted a genocidal war against the Huron people. Settlements were burned, and of the 30,000 Hurons, a few thousand were able to flee and avoid becoming victims of the ethnic genocide. Ned Blackhawk, in analysing the war between the Iroquois and Huron, found that the Iroquois committed all five acts described in the 1948 Genocide Convention.

==== Newfoundland ====
The Beothuks attempted to avoid contact with Europeans in Newfoundland by moving from their traditional settlements, into ecosystems unable to support them, causing under-nourishment and, eventually, starvation. The Beothuks' main food sources were caribou, fish, and seals; their forced displacement deprived them of two of these. This led to the over-hunting of caribou, leading to a decrease in the caribou population in Newfoundland. Scholars disagree in their definition of genocide in relation to the Beothuk. While some scholars believe that the Beothuk died out as an unintended consequence of European colonisation, others argue that Europeans conducted a sustained campaign of genocide against them. They were officially declared "extinct" after the death of Shanawdithit in 1829 in the capital, St. John's, where she had been taken.

==== Dominion of Canada ====
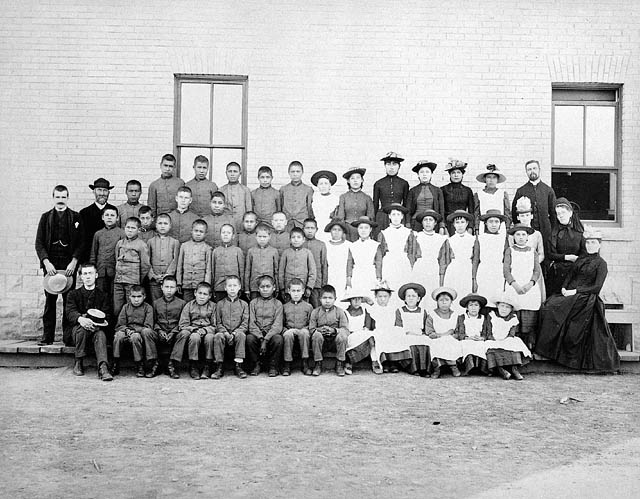
St. Paul's Indian Industrial School, Middlechurch, Manitoba, 1901

Beginning in 1874 and lasting until 1996, the Canadian government, in partnership with the dominant Christian Churches, ran 130 residential boarding schools across Canada for Aboriginal children, who were forcibly taken from their homes. Over the course of the system's existence, about 30% of native children, or roughly 150,000, were placed in residential schools nationally; at least 6,000 of these students died while in attendance. While the schools provided some education, they were plagued by under-funding, disease, abuse, and sexual abuse. The negative effects of the residential school system have long been accepted almost unanimously among scholars researching the residential school system, with debate focussing on the motives and intent.

Indigenous people of Canada have long referred to the residential school system as genocide, with scholars referring to the system as genocidal since the 1990s. According to some scholars, the Canadian government's laws and policies, including the residential school system, that encouraged or required Indigenous peoples to assimilate into a Eurocentric society, violated the United Nations Genocide Convention that Canada signed in 1949 and passed through Parliament in 1952. Therefore, these scholars believe that Canada could be tried in international court for genocide. Others also point to the UN Declaration on the Rights of Indigenous Peoples, which was adopted into Canadian law in 2010, where article 7 discusses the rights of indigenous people to not be subjected to genocide or "any other act of violence, including forcibly removing children of the group to another group".

=== Haiti ===
Jean-Jacques Dessalines, the first ruler of an independent Haiti, ordered the killing of the white population of French creoles on Haiti, which culminated in the 1804 Haitian massacre. According to Philippe Girard, "when the genocide was over, Haiti's white population was virtually non-existent."

=== Hispaniola ===
The Taíno genocide refers to the extermination of the indigenous population of Hispaniola due to forced labor and exploitation by the Spanish. Raphael Lemkin considered Spain's abuses of the native population of the Americas to constitute cultural and even outright genocide including the abuses of the encomienda system. University of Hawaii historian David Stannard describes the encomienda as a genocidal system which "had driven many millions of native peoples in Central and South America to early and agonising deaths." Yale University's genocide studies program supports this view regarding the abuses in Hispaniola. Andrés Reséndez argues that even though the Spanish were aware of the spread of smallpox, they made no mention of it until 1519, a quarter century after Columbus arrived in Hispaniola. Instead he contends that enslavement in gold and silver mines was the primary reason why the Native American population of Hispaniola dropped so significantly and that even though disease was a factor, the native population would have rebounded the same way Europeans did during the Black Death if it were not for the constant enslavement they were subject to. According to anthropologist Jason Hickel, a third of Arawak workers died every six months from lethal forced labor in the mines. Conley and de Waal highlight the weaponisation of starvation employed by conquistadors against the Taíno as being a contributing factor to the genocide, and historian Harald E. Braun highlight Jaragua massacre in 1503 as a case of genocidal massacre.

=== Mexico ===
==== Yucatán ====
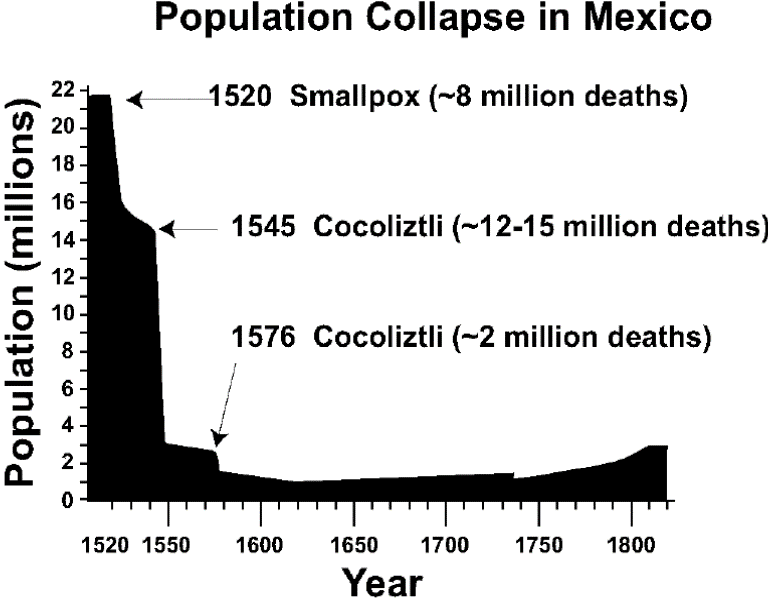
Graph of population decline in central Mexico caused by successive epidemics

The Caste War of Yucatán (approx. 1847–1901) against the population of European descent, known locally as Yucatecos, who held political and economic control of the region. Adam Jones wrote: "Genocidal atrocities on both sides cost up to 200,000 killed".

==== Apaches ====
In 1835, Don Ignacio Zuniga, commander of the presidios of northern Sonora, asserted that since 1820, the Apaches had killed at least 5,000 Mexican settlers in retaliation for land encroachments in Apachería. The State of Sonora then offered a bounty on Apache scalps in 1835. Beginning in 1837, the State of Chihuahua also offered a bounty of 100 pesos per warrior, 50 pesos per woman and 25 pesos per child.

==== Yaquis ====
The Mexican government's response to the various uprisings of the Yaqui tribe have been likened to genocide particularly under Porfirio Diaz. By the end of Diaz's rule at least 20,000 Yaquis were killed in Sonora and their population was reduced from 30,000 to 7,000. Mexican president Andrés Manuel López Obrador said he'd be willing to offer apologies for the abuses in 2019.

=== New England colonies ===
The Pequot War was an armed conflict that started in 1636 and ended in 1638 in New England, between the Pequot tribe and an alliance of the colonists from the Massachusetts Bay, Plymouth, and Saybrook colonies and their allies from the Narragansett and Mohegan tribes. The war concluded with the decisive defeat of the Pequot. At the end, about 700 Pequots had been killed or taken into captivity. Hundreds of prisoners were sold into slavery to colonists in Bermuda or the West Indies; other survivors were dispersed as captives to the victorious tribes. Scholars such as Michael Freeman and Benjamin Madley have concluded that the war was genocidal in nature, with Madley arguing that it set a precedent for colonial relations with Native Americans going forward.

=== Peru ===
The Rebellion of Túpac Amaru II was an uprising by cacique-led Aymara, Quechua, and mestizo rebels aimed at overthrowing Spanish colonial rule in Peru from 1780 to 1783. During the rebellion, especially after the death of Túpac Amaru II, non-Indians were systematically killed by the rebels. Some historians have described these killings aimed at non-Indians, in conjunction with attempts to violently eradicate various non-Indian cultural customs, as genocidal in nature.

The Putumayo genocide involved the hunting and enslavement of members of the Huitoto, Andoques, Yaguas, Ocaina and Boras groups by the Peruvian Amazon Company, so they could be used to extract latex. During this time period, several tribes became extinct, with 80–86% of the total population (Note: 32,000–40,000 people, reported by Roger Casement by the time investigators were sent to the Putumayo.) in the Putumayo region perishing during the Amazon rubber boom.

=== St Kitts ===
The Kalinago genocide was the genocidal massacre of an estimated 2,000 Kalinago people by English and French settlers on the island of Saint Kitts in 1626.

=== United States ===
According to Roxanne Dunbar-Ortiz, US history as well as inherited Indigenous trauma cannot be understood without dealing with the genocide that the United States committed against Indigenous peoples. Ortiz states that from the colonial period through the founding of the United States and continuing in the twentieth century, this has entailed torture, terror, sexual abuse, massacres, systematic military occupations, removals of Indigenous peoples from their ancestral territories, forced removal of Native American children to military-like boarding schools, allotment, and a policy of termination.

The leader of this battle, British High Commander Jeffery Amherst authorised the intentional use of disease as a biological weapon, notably during the 1763 Siege of Fort Pitt against indigenous populations, saying, "You will Do well to try to Innoculate the Indians by means of Blankets, as well as to try Every other method that can serve to Extirpate this Execrable Race.", and instructing his subordinates, "I need only Add, I Wish to Hear of no prisoners should any of the villains be met with arms." British militia's William Trent and Simeon Ecuyer gave smallpox-exposed blankets to Native American emissaries as gifts during the Siege of Fort Pitt, "to Convey the Smallpox to the Indians", in one of the most famously documented cases of germ warfare. While it is uncertain how successful such attempts were against the target population, historians have noted that, "history records numerous instances of the French, the Spanish, the British, and later on the American, using smallpox as an ignoble means to an end. For smallpox was more feared by the Indian than the bullet: he could be exterminated and subjugated more easily and quickly by the death-bringing virus than by the weapons of the white man."

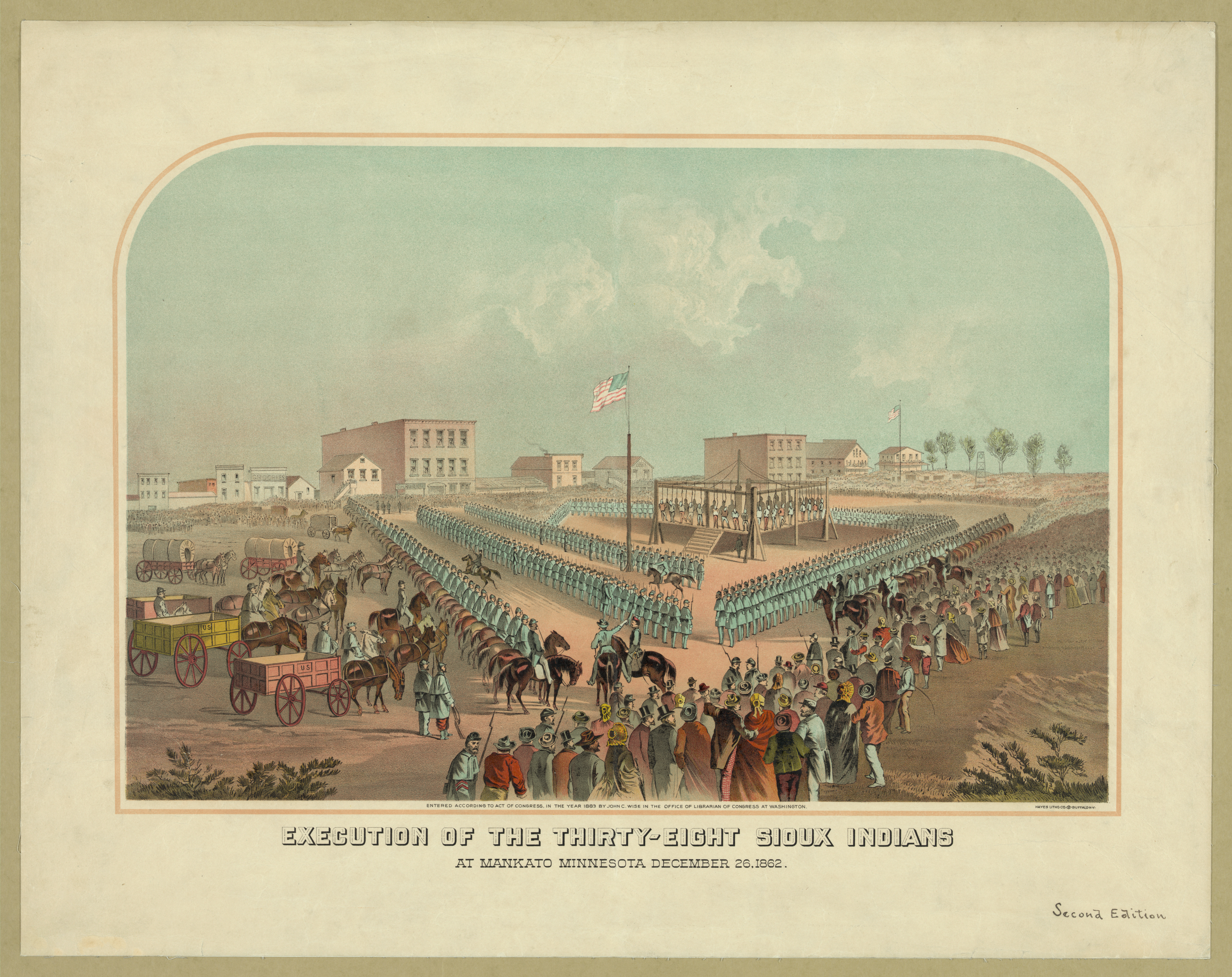
President Abraham Lincoln approved the mass execution of 38 Dakota Native Americans convicted in Minnesota following the Dakota War of 1862

During the American Indian Wars, the United States Army carried out a number of massacres and forced relocations of Indigenous peoples, acts that some scholars say constitute genocide. The Sand Creek massacre, which caused outrage in its own time, has been called genocide. General John Chivington led a 700-man force of Colorado Territory militia in a massacre of 70–163 peaceful Cheyenne and Arapaho, about two-thirds of whom were women, children, and infants. Chivington and his men took scalps and other body parts as trophies, including human fetuses and male and female genitalia. In defense of his actions Chivington stated,

Damn any man who sympathizes with Indians! ... I have come to kill Indians, and believe it is right and honorable to use any means under God's heaven to kill Indians. ... Kill and scalp all, big and little; nits make lice.

— Col. John Milton Chivington, U.S. Army

A study by Gregory Michno concluded that of 21,586 tabulated casualties (killed, wounded or captured) in a selected 672 battles and skirmishes, military personnel and settlers accounted for 6,596 (31%), while indigenous casualties totalled about 14,990 (69%) for the period 1850–90. Michno's study almost exclusively uses Army estimates. His follow-up book "Forgotten Battles and Skirmishes" covers over 300 additional fights not included in these statistics.

According to the U.S. Bureau of the Census (1894), between 1789 and 1891, "The Indian wars under the government of the United States have been more than 40 in number. They have cost the lives of about 19,000 white men, women and children, including those killed in individual combats, and the lives of about 30,000 Indians. The actual number of killed and wounded Indians must be very much higher than the given... Fifty percent additional would be a safe estimate..." In the same 1894 report, the Census Bureau dismissed assertions that millions of Native Americans once inhabited what is now the United States, insisting instead that North America in 1492 was an almost empty continent, and "guesstimating" that aboriginal populations "could not have exceeded much over 500,000", whereas modern scholarship now estimates from 2.1 million to more than 10 million.

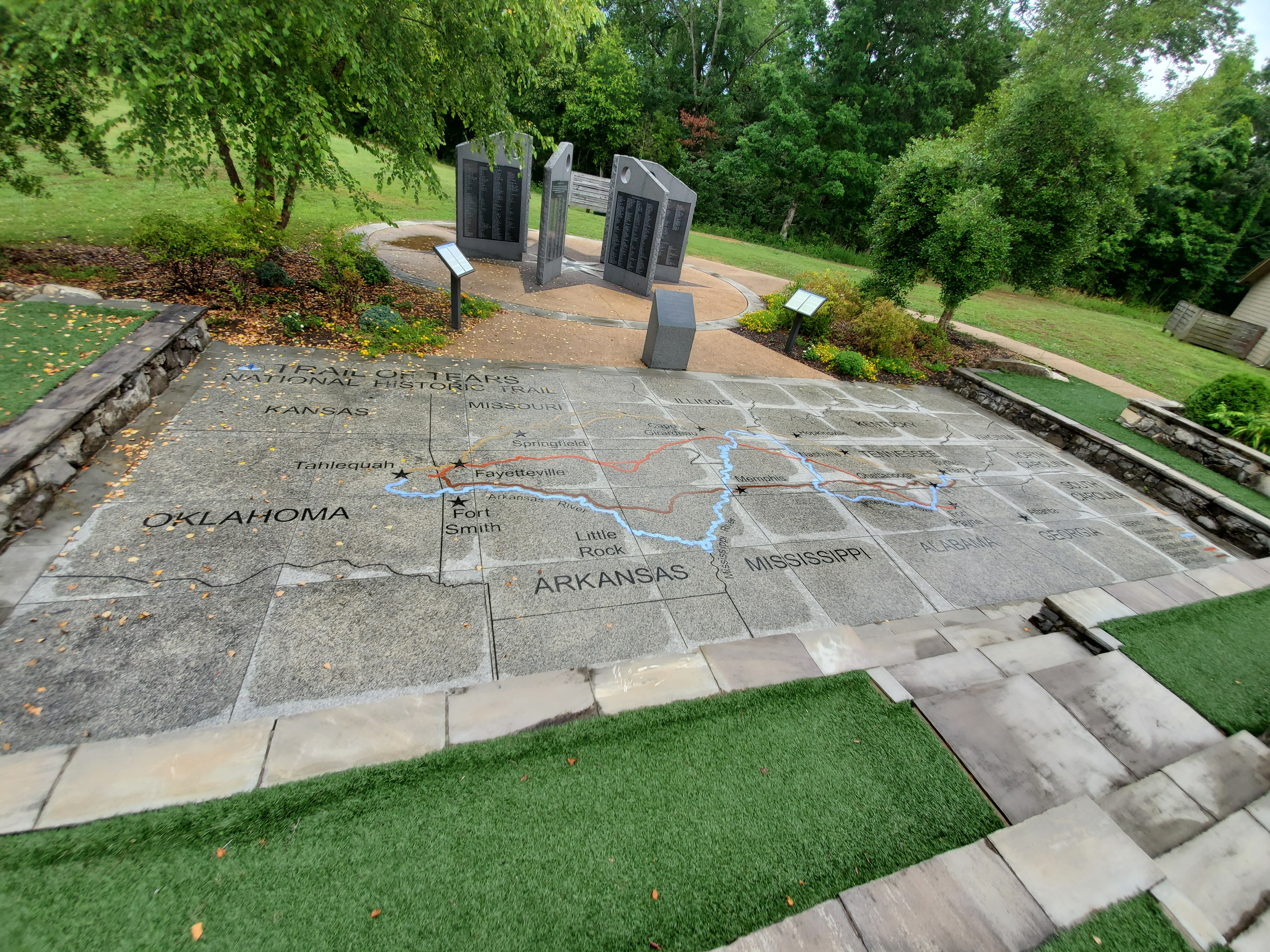
Walkway map at the Cherokee Trail of Tears State Park in Tennessee depicting the routes of the Cherokee on the Trail of Tears, June 2020

Chalk and Jonassohn argued that the deportation of the Cherokee tribe along the Trail of Tears would almost certainly be considered an act of genocide today. The Indian Removal Act of 1830 led to the exodus. About 17,000 Cherokees—along with approximately 2,000 Cherokee-owned black slaves—were removed from their homes. The number of people who died as a result of the Trail of Tears has been variously estimated. American doctor and missionary Elizur Butler, who made the journey with one party, estimated 4,000 deaths. Historians David Stannard and Barbara Mann have noted that the army deliberately routed the march of the Cherokee to pass through areas of known cholera epidemic, such as Vicksburg. Stannard estimates that during the forced removal from their homelands, following the Indian Removal Act signed into law by President Andrew Jackson in 1830, 8,000 Cherokee died, about half the total population.

A smallpox epidemic struck the Great Plains in 1836–1840, resulting in the deaths of many, including 90% of the Mandan who previously numbered 1,600. While specific responsibility for the epidemic remains in question, scholars have asserted that the Great Plains epidemic was "started among the tribes of the upper Missouri River by failure to quarantine steam boats on the river", and Captain Pratt of the St. Peter "was guilty of contributing to the deaths of thousands of innocent people. The law calls his offense criminal negligence. Yet in light of all the deaths, the almost complete annihilation of the Mandans, and the terrible suffering the region endured, the label criminal negligence is benign, hardly befitting an action that had such horrendous consequences." Archaeologist and anthropologist Ann F. Ramenofsky writes, "Variola Major can be transmitted through contaminated articles such as clothing or blankets. In the nineteenth century, the U. S. Army sent contaminated blankets to Native Americans, especially Plains groups, to control the Indian problem." According to Alexander Hinton, "the genocide of many Native American tribes" including the Mandans, was caused by "governmental assimilationist policies that coexisted with officially or unofficially sanctioned campaigns of war to eradicate, diminish, or forcibly evict the 'savages'". When smallpox swept the northern plains of the US in 1837, Secretary of War Lewis Cass ordered that the Mandan (along with the Arikara, the Cree, and the Blackfeet) not be given smallpox vaccinations, which had been provided to other tribes in other areas. Some have posited that some tribes weren't given vaccines because they were hostile or because their land wasn't important for trading.

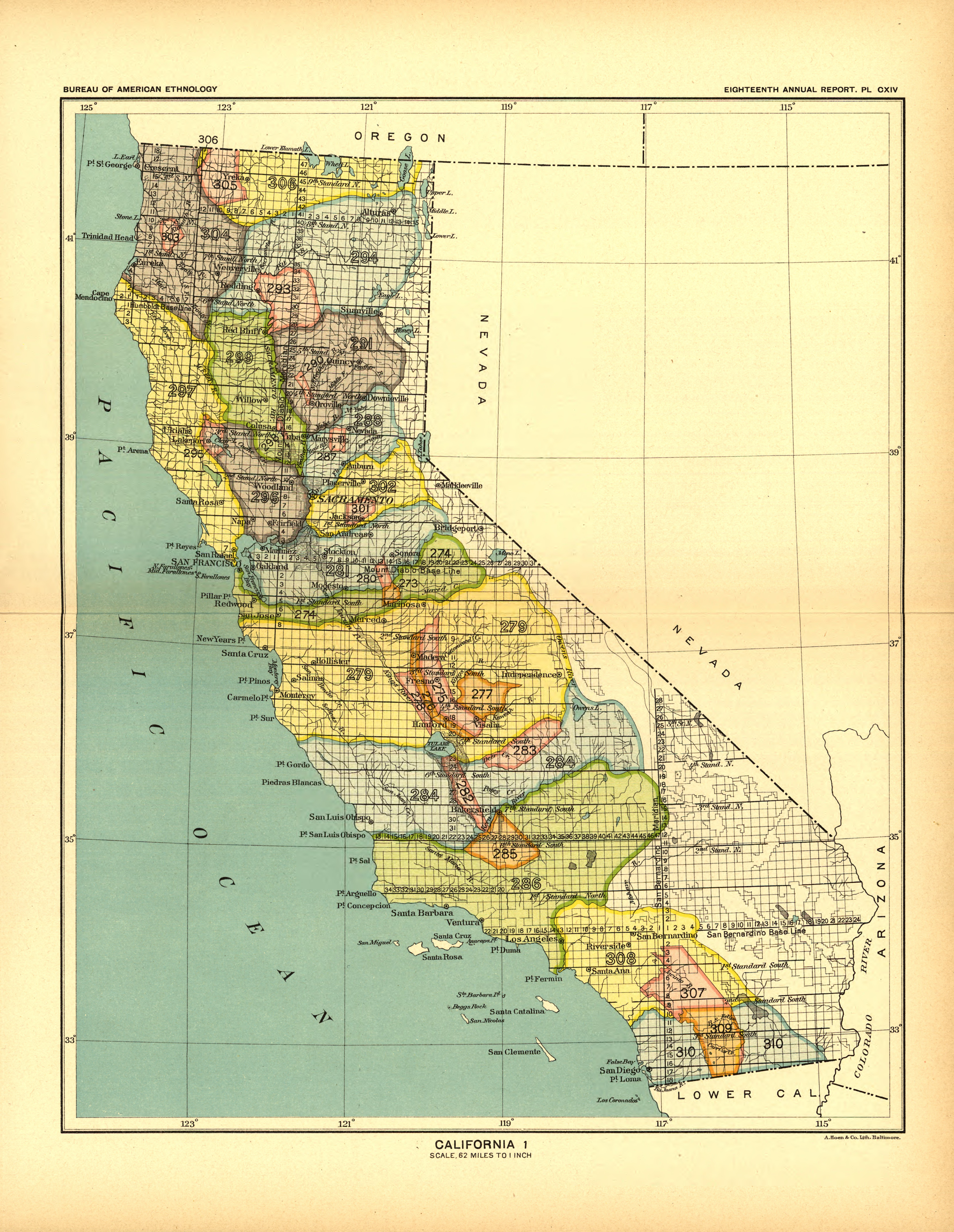
Map of California from Indian Land Cessions in the United States

The U.S. colonisation of California started in earnest in 1849, and it resulted in a large number of state-subsidised massacres of the Indigenous peoples of California by colonists in the territory, causing several ethnic groups to be entirely wiped out. In one such series of conflicts, the so-called Mendocino War and the subsequent Round Valley War, the entirety of the Yuki people were brought to the brink of extinction, from a previous population of some 3,500 people to fewer than 100. According to Russell Thornton, estimates of the pre-Columbian Indigenous population of California were at least 310,000, and perhaps as high as 705,000, but by 1849, due to Spanish and Mexican colonisation and epidemics this number had decreased to 100,000, and from 1849 to 1890, the indigenous population of California had fallen below 20,000, primarily because of the killings. In An American Genocide, The United States and the California Catastrophe, 1846–1873, historian Benjamin Madley recorded the number of killings of Indigenous Californians that occurred between 1846 and 1873. He found evidence that during this period, at least 9,400 to 16,000 Native Americans were killed by non-Indigenous. Most of these killings occurred in more than 370 massacres (defined as the "intentional killing of five or more disarmed combatants or largely unarmed noncombatants, including women, children, and prisoners, whether in the context of a battle or otherwise"). 10,000 Native Americans were also kidnapped and enslaved. In a speech before representatives of Native American peoples in June 2019, California governor Gavin Newsom apologised for the genocide. Newsom said, "That's what it was, a genocide. No other way to describe it. And that's the way it needs to be described in the history books."

Indeed, noted children's book author of "The Wizard of Oz", L. Frank Baum, contemporaneously and freely admitted to the definition of genocide—annihilation of a people—as being deliberately intended, in the aftermath of the Wounded Knee massacre and slaughter of the Lakota and their leader Sitting Bull:

"The Whites, by law of conquest, by justice of civilisation, are masters of the American continent, and the best safety of the frontier settlements will be secured by the total annihilation of the few remaining Indians. Why not annihilation? Their glory has fled, their spirit broken, their manhood effaced; better that they die than live the miserable wretches that they are."

In line with Dunbar-Ortiz's assessment, historian Preston McBride argues that the American Indian boarding school system meets the same criteria for genocide as was found in investigations into the Canadian Indian boarding school system.

=== Uruguay ===
The Massacre of Salsipuedes was a genocidal attack carried out on 11 April 1831 by the Uruguayan Army, led by Fructuoso Rivera, as the culmination of the state's efforts to eradicate the Charrúa from Uruguay. According to official reports, 40 were killed and 300 were taken prisoner, with an uncertain number managing to escape.

== Asia ==
=== Afghanistan ===
Abdur Rahman's subjugation of the Hazara ethnic group in the late nineteenth century due to its fierce rebellion against the Afghan king gave birth to an intense feeling of hatred between the Pashtun and the Hazara that would last for years to come. Massive forced displacements, especially in Oruzgan and Daychopan, continued as lands were confiscated and populations were expelled or fled. Some 35,000 families fled to northern Afghanistan, Mashhad (Iran) and Quetta (Pakistan). It is estimated that more than 60% of the Hazara were either massacred or displaced during Abdur Rahman's campaign against them. Hazara farmers were often forced to give their property to Pashtuns and as a result many Hazara families had to seasonally move to the major cities in Afghanistan, Iran, or Pakistan to find jobs and sources of income.

=== British rule of India ===
Mike Davis argues in his book Late Victorian Holocausts that quote; "Millions died, not outside the 'modern world system', but in the very process of being forcibly incorporated into its economic and political structures. They died in the golden age of Liberal Capitalism; indeed many were murdered...by the theological application of the sacred principles of Smith, Bentham, and Mill."

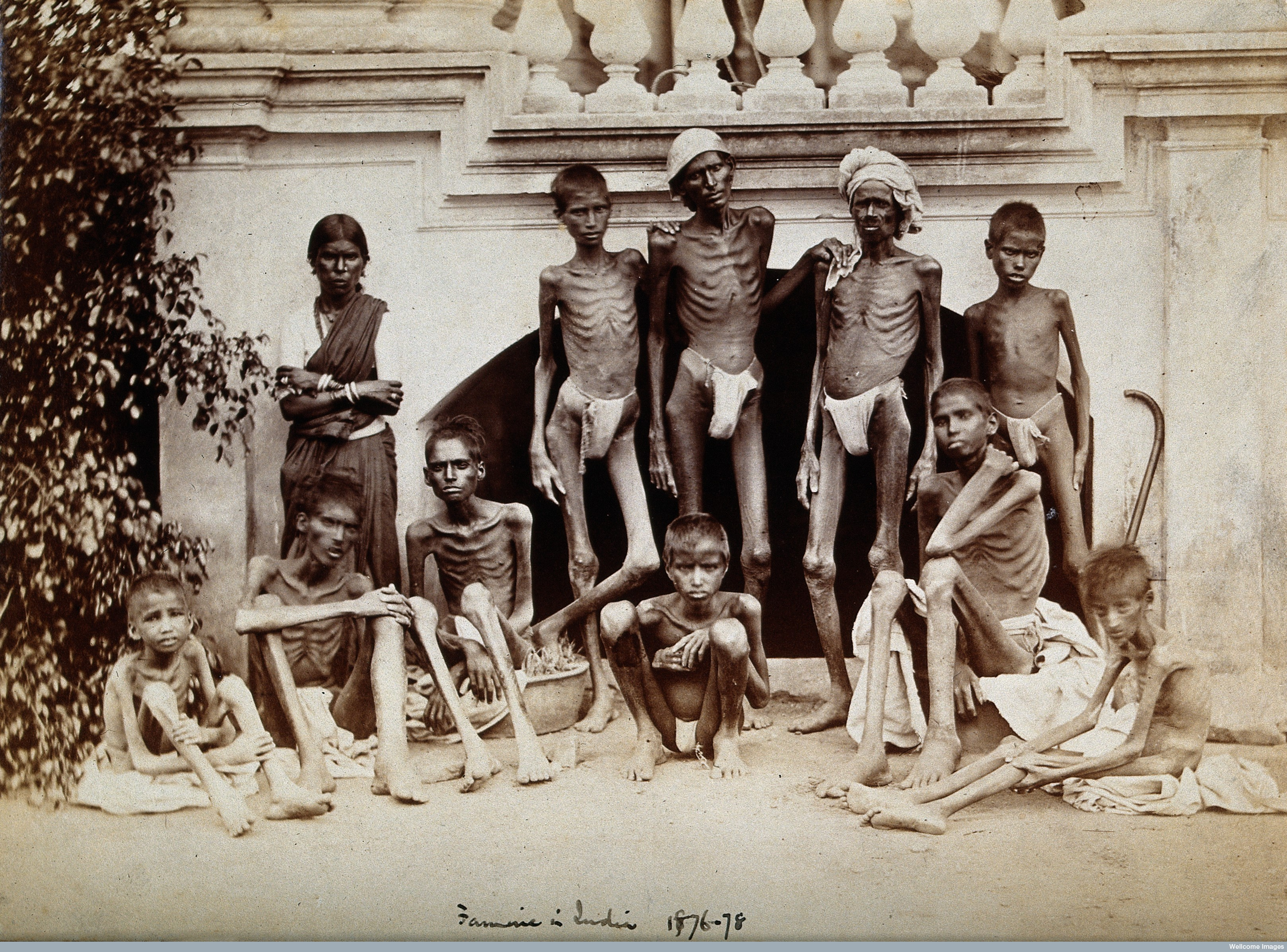
Famine stricken people during the famine of 1876–78 in Bengal

Davis characterises the Indian famines under the British Raj, such as the Great Bengal famine of 1770 or the Great Famine of 1876-78 which took over 15 million lives as "colonial genocide". Some scholars, including Niall Ferguson, have disputed this judgement, while others, including Adam Jones, have affirmed it.

=== Champa ===
The Vietnamese Empire adopted repressive measures against the Chams, which some commentators have labeled genocide.

=== Dutch East Indies ===
The Dutch conquest of the Banda Islands was a process of military conquest from 1609 to 1621 by the Dutch East India Company (VOC) of the Banda Islands. Judging that Bandanese resistance to Dutch attempts to establish their commercial supremacy in the archipelago had to be crushed once and for all, the VOC governor-general Jan Pieterszoon Coen wrote a letter to the Heeren XVII on 26 October 1620, stating: "To adequately deal with this matter, it is necessary to once again subjugate Banda, and populate it with other people." As proposed, the Heeren XVII instructed him to subjugate the Bandanese and drive their leaders out of the land. This culminated in the Banda massacre, which saw 2,800 Bandanese killed and 1,700 enslaved by the Dutch. Along with starvation and constant fighting, the Bandanese felt they could not continue to resist the Dutch and negotiated a surrender in 1621. Coen expelled the remaining 1,000 Bandanese to Batavia. The conquest saw in total the Bandanese population decrease from around 15,000 to around 1,000.

The 1740 Batavia massacre (Dutch: Chinezenmoord; French: Meurtre des Chinois, literally the "Murder of the Chinese"; Indonesian: Geger Pacinan, or the "Chinatown Tumult") was a pogrom in which Dutch East Indies soldiers and native collaborators killed ethnic Chinese residents of the port city of Batavia (present-day Jakarta) in the Dutch East Indies. The violence which occurred in the city lasted from 9 October until 22 October 1740, with minor skirmishes continuing to occur outside the city walls into late November. Historians have estimated that at least 10,000 ethnic Chinese were massacred; just 600 to 3,000 are believed to have survived.

=== Dzungar genocide ===
The Dzungar (or known as Zunghar), Oirat Mongols who lived in an area that stretched from the west end of the Great Wall of China to present-day eastern Kazakhstan and from present-day northern Kyrgyzstan to southern Siberia (most of which is located in present-day Xinjiang), were the last nomadic empire to threaten China, which they did from the early 17th century through the middle of the 18th century. (Note: Chapters 3–7 of Perdue 2005 describe the rise and fall of the Zunghar state and its relations with other Mongol tribes, the Qing dynasty, and the Russian empire.) After a series of inconclusive military conflicts that started in the 1680s, the Dzungars were subjugated by the Manchu-led Qing dynasty (1644–1911) in the late 1750s. According to Qing scholar Wei Yuan, 40 percent of the 600,000 Zunghar people were killed by smallpox, 20 percent fled to Russia or sought refuge among the Kazakh tribes and 30 percent were killed by the Qing army of Manchu Bannermen and Khalkha Mongols.

Mongolist Charles Bawden was the first to describe the Qing treatment of the Dzungar as "genocide" in the 1960s. Political scientist Michael E. Clarke, who specialises in the history of Xinjiang, has argued that the Qing campaign in 1757–58 "amounted to the complete destruction of not only the Zunghar state but of the Zunghars as a people". Historian Peter Perdue has attributed the decimation of the Dzungars to a "deliberate use of massacre" and has described it as an "ethnic genocide". Mark Levene, a historian of genocide, has stated that the extermination of the Dzungars was "arguably the eighteenth century genocide par excellence".

=== Taiping Rebellion ===
The Taiping Rebellion was a massive rebellion which was launched by Hong Xiuquan, an ethnic Hakka (a Han subgroup) and the self-proclaimed younger brother of Jesus, who sought to overthrow the Manchu-led Qing dynasty and replace it with a Chinese Christian theocratic absolute monarchy which he named the Taiping Heavenly Kingdom. One of the bloodiest wars in history and the bloodiest civil war in history, the Taiping Rebellion was marked by genocidal atrocities which were perpetrated by both of the sides which fought in the conflict.

In every area which they captured, the Taiping immediately exterminated the entire Manchu population. In the province of Hunan one Qing loyalist who observed the genocidal massacres which the Taiping forces committed against the Manchus wrote that the "pitiful Manchus", the Manchu men, women and children were executed by the Taiping forces. The Taiping rebels were seen chanting while slaughtering the Manchus in Hefei. After capturing Nanjing, Taiping forces killed about 40,000 Manchu civilians. On 27 October 1853, they crossed the Yellow River in T'sang-chou and murdered 10,000 Manchus.

Since the rebellion began in Guangxi, Qing forces allowed no rebels who spoke its dialect to surrender. Reportedly in the province of Guangdong, it is written that 1,000,000 were executed because after the collapse of the Taiping Heavenly Kingdom, the Qing dynasty launched waves of massacres against the Hakkas, that at their height killed up to 30,000 each day. These policies of mass murder of civilians occurred elsewhere in China, including Anhui, and Nanjing. This resulted in a massive civilian flight and death toll with some 600 towns destroyed and other bloody policies resulting.

=== Japanese colonisation of Hokkaido ===
The Ainu are an indigenous people in Japan, living mainly on the island of Hokkaido. In a 2009 news story, Japan Today reported, "Many Ainu were forced to work, essentially as slaves, for Wajin (ethnic Japanese), resulting in the breakup of families and the introduction of smallpox, measles, cholera and tuberculosis into their communities. In 1869, after the Battle of Hakodate during the Boshin War, the new Meiji government renamed the Republic of Ezo Hokkaido, whose boundaries were formed by former members of the Tokugawa shogunate, and together with lands where the Ainu lived, they were unilaterally incorporated into Japan. It banned the Ainu language, took Ainu lands away, and prohibited the Ainu from engaging in salmon fishing and deer hunting." Historian Roy Thomas wrote: "Ill treatment of native peoples is common to all colonial powers, and, at its worst, leads to genocide. Japan's native people, the Ainu, have, however, been the object of a particularly cruel hoax, because the Japanese have refused to accept them officially as a separate minority people." In 2004, the small Ainu community which lives in Russia wrote a letter to Vladimir Putin, urging him to recognise Japanese mistreatment of the Ainu people as a genocide, something which Putin declined to do.

Geographer Naohiro Nakamura and anthropologist Mark Watson identify Japanese governmental and administrative practices in reporting on Ainu people especially in urban settings that erased them from the statistical and demographic record as Ainu. Anthropologist Ann-Elise Lewallen wrote in 2016 that the Japanese colonisation of lands inhabited by the Ainu had "genocidal consequences" for the Ainu, and that the Ainu were made indigenous through the "invasion and colonial subjugation of their ancestral lands, lifeways, and attempted genocide of their ancestors". Lewallen, alongside researchers Robert Hughes and Esther Brito Ruiz have detailed how the assimilationist policies of Japan from the 19th century has resulted in a cultural genocide of the Ainu, where their existence was only permitted if they ceased being Ainu. Historian Michael Roellinghoff described the bureaucratic mechanisms that sort to assimilate the Ainu into Japanese society and erase their distinct identity as "insidiously genocidal". In "Hokkaidō 150: settler colonialism and Indigeneity in modern Japan and beyond" historian Tristan Grunow et al. detail how the Ainu of Hokkaido were subjected to a process of settler colonialism and genocidal practices that align with the genocidal actions detail in the United Nations Genocide Convention.

=== Jindandao incident ===
The Jindandao incident was a rebellion by a Han Chinese secret society called Jindandao (金丹道), which rose in revolt in Inner Mongolia in November 1891 and genocidally massacred 150,000–500,000 Mongols before it was suppressed by government troops in late December.

=== Armenians, Assyrians, Bulgarians, Greeks ===
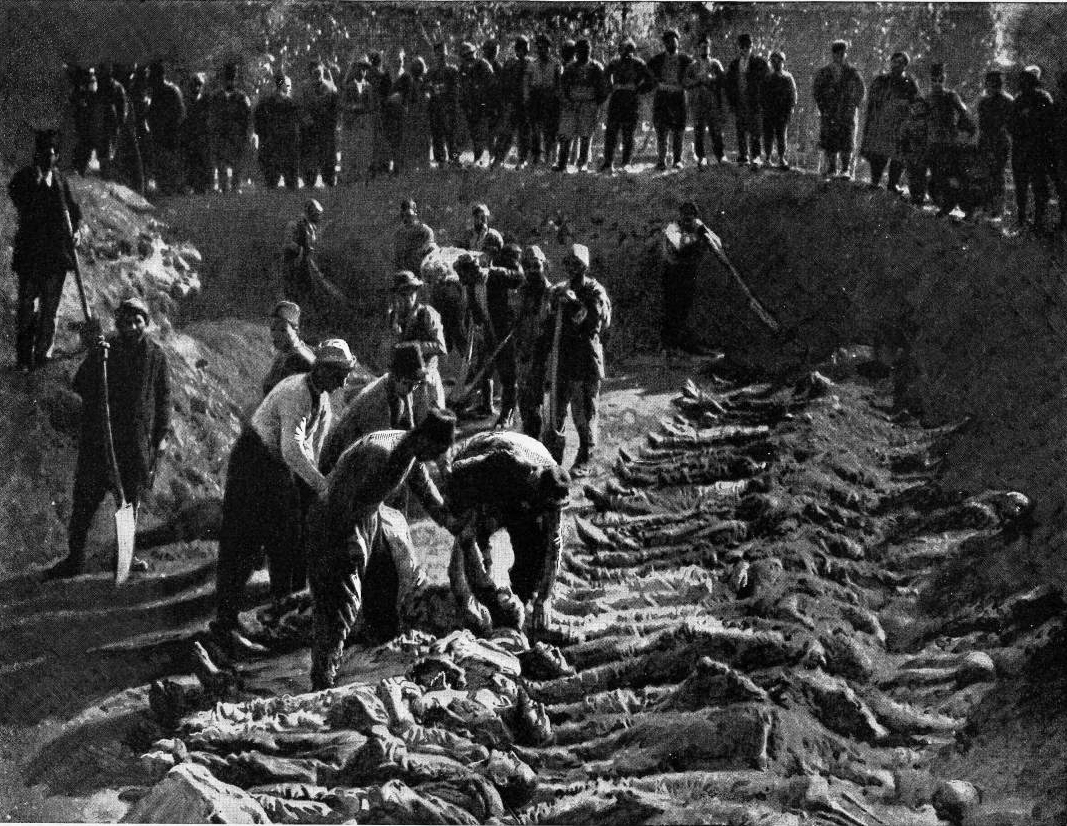
The Hamidian massacres were massacres of Armenians in the Ottoman Empire during the mid-1890s, with estimates of the dead ranging from 80,000 to 300,000.

The Massacres of Badr Khan were committed against the Assyrian Christian population of the Ottoman Empire by Kurdish and Ottoman forces between 1843 and 1847, resulting in the slaughter of more than 10,000 indigenous Assyrian civilians who were inhabitants of the Hakkari region, and many thousands more were sold into slavery.

During the suppression of the April uprising in Bulgaria in May–June 1876, 30,000 Bulgarians died and 5,000 Bulgarians were killed in Batak – according to modern researchers, the Batak massacre was the starting point of genocide in the modern era.

Between 1894 and 1896, a series of ethnically religiously motivated Anti-Christian pogroms which are known as the Hamidian massacres were committed against the ancient Armenian and Assyrian Christian populations by the forces of the Ottoman Empire. The massacres were mainly committed in regions which were located in what is modern-day south eastern Turkey, north eastern Syria and northern Iraq. According to estimates, between 80,000 and 300,000 were killed, and 546,000 Armenians and Assyrians who survived the massacres were made destitute when they were forcibly deported from cities, and almost 2,500 of their farmsteads, towns and villages were either destroyed or stolen. Hundreds of churches and monasteries were either destroyed or forcibly converted into mosques.

The Adana massacre occurred in the Adana Vilayet of the Ottoman Empire in April 1909. A massacre of Armenian and Assyrian Christians in the city of Adana and its surroundings amidst the Ottoman countercoup of 1909 triggered a series of anti-Christian pogroms throughout the province. Reports estimated that the Adana Province massacres resulted in the death of as many as 30,000 Armenians and the death of as many as 1,500 Assyrians.

From 1913 to 1923, the Greek, Assyrian, and Armenian genocides took place in the Ottoman Empire. Some historians consider these genocides a single event and they refer to them as the late Ottoman genocides.

=== Philippines ===
==== Spanish colonial era ====
Belinda A. Aquino describes Spanish colonial rule of the Philippines as one of the "most cruel colonial regimes in world history", characterised by the systematic destruction of native communities and their institutions, while the natives were forced to work on the colonial government's projects. She writes that the Spaniards imposed an alien religion, Catholicism, on the population, while the native people's sacred indigenous religions and shrines were all destroyed. She describes the Spanish conquest as a genocide, with killings of natives being common. Furthermore, she writes that the Spanish continued to view the natives of the Philippines as "savages" and "pagans who had to be civilised" despite the fact that they perpetrated atrocities.

According to Linda A. Newson's research, demographic decline occurred in the Philippines during the sixteenth and seventeenth centuries, primarily as a result of destructive epidemics which were introduced on the islands during the establishment of the Spanish colonial regime. It was previously assumed that the natives of the Philippines were immune to the diseases which decimated the populations of the New World, but Newson, who used the data which she collected from historical demographic documents, argues that intermittent contact and a low population density prevented the spread of such diseases before the arrival of the Spaniards, thus making them lethal to vulnerable populations. Yet, despite its previous lack of exposure, the diseases which were introduced to the indigenous population of the Philippines were not seen as having an impact which was as great as the impact which they had on the indigenous populations of the New World. Newson also argues that the same factors which kept the diseases at bay before the Spanish conquest also curtailed the spread of the infections during the early years of the Spanish colonial period. Newson also concludes that, for the indigenous population of the Philippines, "the demographic decline which occurred during the seventeenth century was the outcome of a complex interaction of factors which included the Hispano-Dutch War, the restructuring of Filipino communities, and periodic famines, epidemics and Moro raids".

==== American and Japanese eras ====
Numerous massacres were committed against Filipinos during the American and Japanese occupations of the Philippines, notably, massacres were committed on Samar and Sulu by Americans during the Philippine-American war, and the Manila massacre was committed by Japanese forces during World War 2.

=== Persecution of Yazidis ===
In 1832, about 70,000 Yazidis were killed by the Sunni Kurdish princes Bedir Khan Beg and Muhammad Pasha of Rawanduz. During his research trips in 1843, the Russian traveller and orientalist Ilya Berezin mentioned that 7,000 Yazidis were killed by Kurds of Rawandiz on the hills of Nineveh near Mosul, shortly before his arrival. According to many historical reports, the Bedir Khan massacres can be classified as a genocide.

== Russian Empire ==
=== Congress Poland ===
The Russification of Poland was an intense process, especially under Partitioned Poland, when the Russian state aimed to denationalise Poles via incremental enforcement of language, culture, the arts, the Orthodox religion and Russian practices. The most forceful Russification was forced onto children.

=== Circassians ===
The Russian Tsarist Empire waged war against Circassia in the Northwest Caucasus for more than one hundred years, trying to secure its hold on Circassia's Black Sea coast. After a century of insurgency and war and failure to end the conflict, the Russian military executed the systematic mass murder, ethnic cleansing, forced migration, and expulsion of 800,000–1,500,000 Circassians. The Georgian government has officially recognised the events as a genocide, as have Circassian advocacy organisations, a stance also held by a plethora of scholars of genocide and other historians, with Oliver Bullough crediting the Russian Empire with "the first modern genocide on European soil", and Anssi Kullberg arguing that the Russian state thus invented "the strategy of modern ethnic cleansing and genocide". Antero Leitzinger flagged the affair the 19th century's largest genocide.

Calculations including those which take the Russian government's own archival figures into account have estimated a loss of 80%–97% of the Circassian nation in the process.

In May 1994, the then Russian president Boris Yeltsin admitted that resistance to the tsarist forces was legitimate, but he did not recognise "the guilt of the tsarist government for the genocide". On 5 July 2005, the Circassian Congress, an organisation that unites representatives of the various Circassian peoples in the Russian Federation, called on Moscow to acknowledge and apologise for the genocide. There is concern by the Russian government that acknowledging the events as genocide would entail possible claims of financial compensation in addition to efforts toward repatriating diaspora Circassians back to Circassia. A presidential commission in Russia has been set up "to counter the attempts to falsify history to the detriment of Russia".

== Europe ==
=== Anti-Romani sentiment (Attempted extirpations of Romani) ===
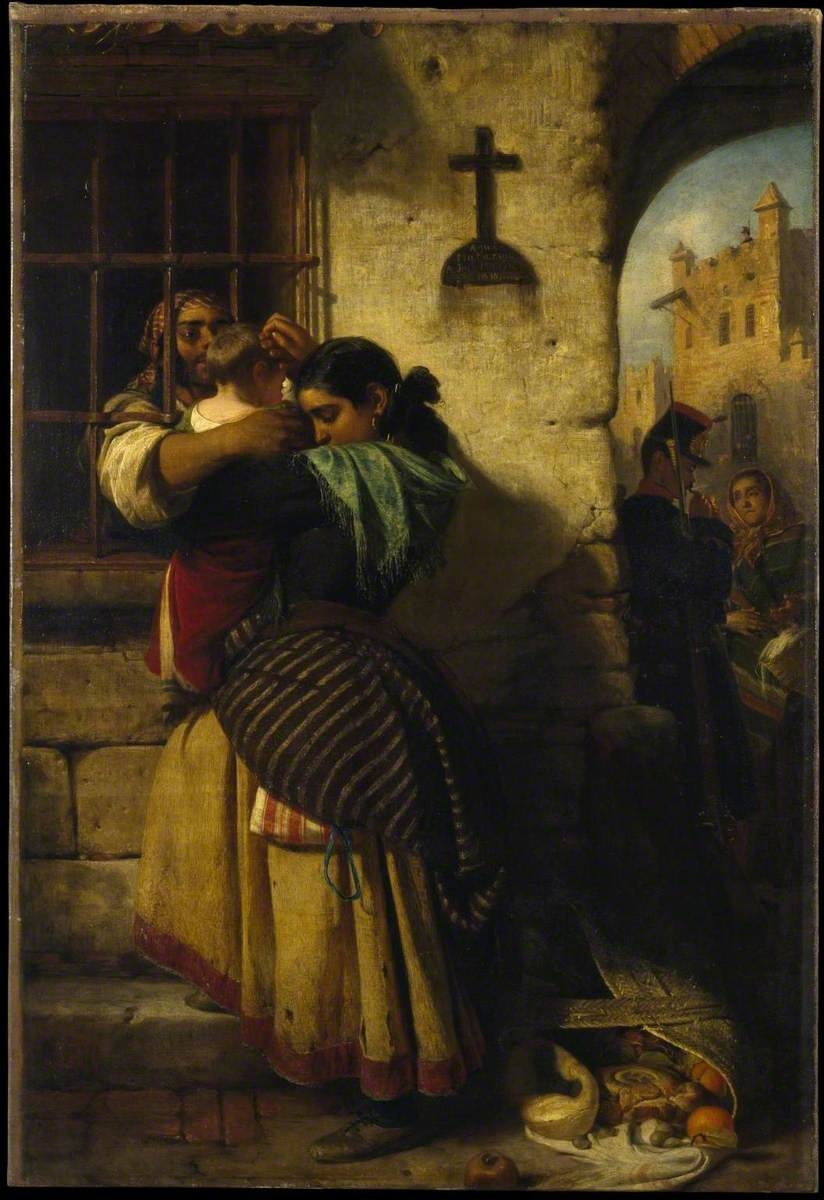
The Prison Window by John Phillip depicting a Romani family in Spain during the Great Gypsy Round-up.

There have been several attempts to extirpate the Romani (Gypsies) throughout the history of Europe:

In 1545, the Diet of Augsburg declared that "whosoever kills a Gypsy (Romani), will be guilty of no murder". The subsequent massive killing spree which took place across the empire later prompted the government to step in to "forbid the drowning of Romani women and children".

In England, the Egyptians Act 1530 banned Romani from entering the country and it also required those Romani who were already living in the country to leave it within 16 days. Failure to do so could result in the confiscation of their property, their imprisonment and deportation. The act was amended with the Egyptians Act 1554, which directed that they abandon their "naughty, idle and ungodly life and company" and adopt a settled lifestyle. For those Romani who failed to adhere to a sedentary existence, the Privy council interpreted the act in a way that permitted the execution of non-complying Romani "as a warning to others".

In 1710, Joseph I, Holy Roman Emperor, issued an edict against the Romani, ordering "that all adult males were to be hanged without trial, whereas women and young males were to be flogged and banished forever." Additionally, in the kingdom of Bohemia, the right ears of Romani men were to be cut off; in the March of Moravia, their left ears were to be cut off. In other parts of Austria, they would be branded on the back with a branding iron, representing the gallows. These mutilations enabled the authorities to identify the individuals as Romani on their second arrest. The edict encouraged local officials to hunt down Romani in their areas by levying a fine of 100 Reichsthaler on those who failed to do so. Anyone who helped Romani was to be punished by doing forced labor for half a year. The result was mass killings of Romani across the Holy Roman empire. In 1721, Charles VI amended the decree to include the execution of adult female Romani, while children were "to be put in hospitals for education".

In 1749 the Great Gypsy Round-up (Spanish: Gran Redada de Gitanos), also known as the general imprisonment of the Gypsies (prisión general de gitanos), occurred where most of the Roma in the region were arrested, and 12,000 Romani people were killed. Although a majority were released after a few months, many others spent several years imprisoned and subject to forced labor. The raid was approved by the King Ferdinand VI of Spain, and organised by the Marquis of Ensenada, and set in motion simultaneously across Spain on 30 July 1749.

In 1774, Maria Theresa of Austria issued an edict which forbade marriages between Romani. When a Romani woman married a non-Romani man, she had to produce proof of "industrious household service and familiarity with Catholic tenets", a male Rom "had to prove his ability to support a wife and children", and "Gypsy children over the age of five were to be taken away and brought up in non-Romani families."

=== France ===
==== Persecution of Huguenots ====
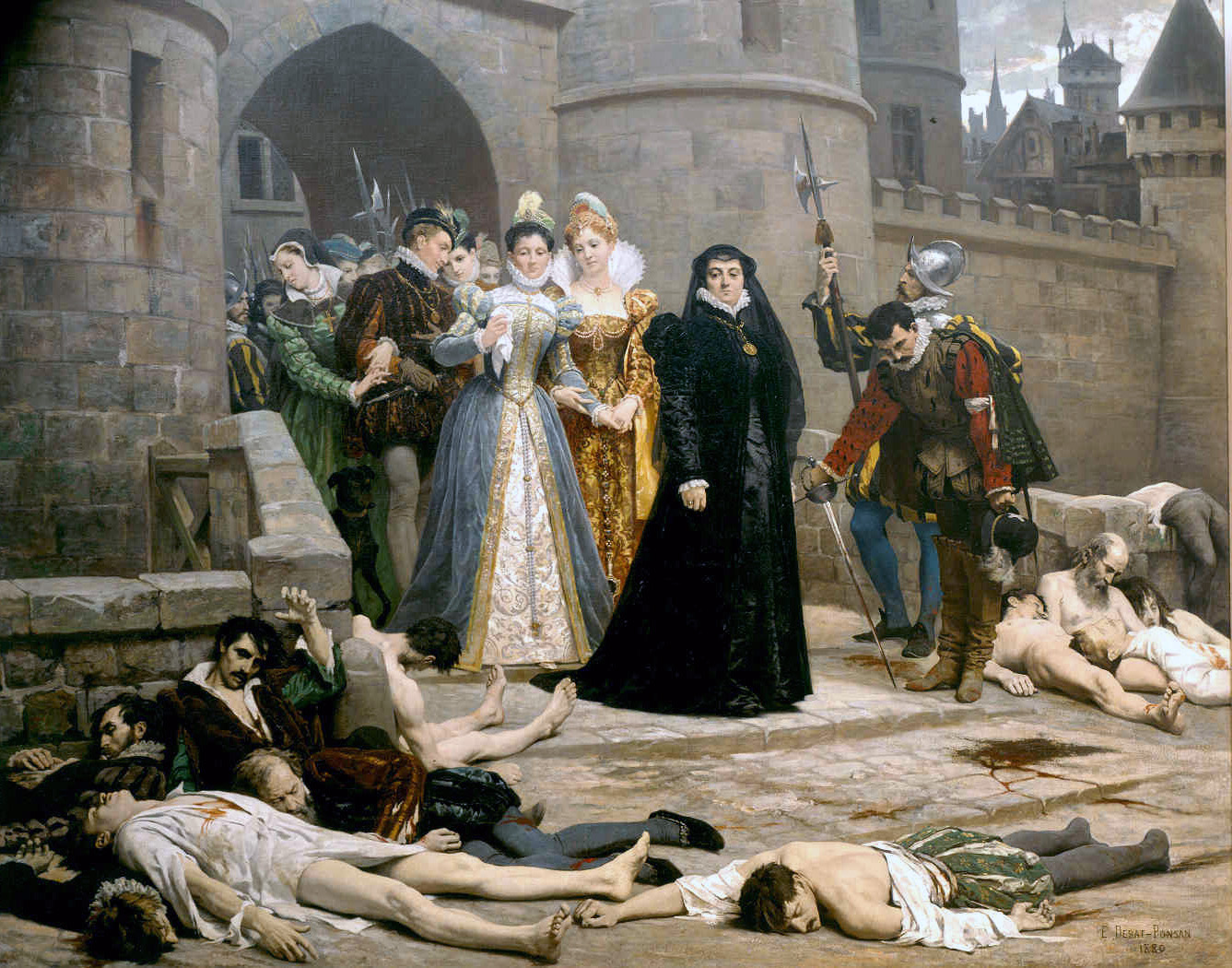
One morning at the gates of the Louvre, 19th-century painting by Édouard Debat-Ponsan.

The St. Bartholomew's Day massacre (French: Massacre de la Saint-Barthélemy) in 1572 was a targeted group of assassinations and a wave of Catholic mob violence, directed against the Huguenots (French Calvinist Protestants) during the French Wars of Religion. Traditionally believed to have been instigated by Queen Catherine de' Medici, the mother of King Charles IX, the massacre started a few days after the marriage of the king's sister Margaret to the Protestant Henry of Navarre (the future Henry IV of France) on 18 August. Many of the wealthiest and most prominent Huguenots had gathered in largely Catholic Paris to attend the wedding.

The massacre began in the night of 23–24 August 1572, the eve of the feast of Bartholomew the Apostle, two days after the attempted assassination of Admiral Gaspard de Coligny, the military and political leader of the Huguenots. King Charles IX ordered the killing of a group of Huguenot leaders, including Coligny, and the slaughter spread throughout Paris. Lasting several weeks in all, the massacre expanded outward to the countryside and other urban centres. Modern estimates for the number of dead across France vary widely, from 6,000 to 30,000.

The massacre marked a turning point in the French Wars of Religion. The Huguenot political movement was crippled by the loss of many of its prominent aristocratic leaders, and many rank-and-file members subsequently converted. Those who remained became increasingly radicalised. Though by no means unique, the blood-letting "was the worst of the century's religious massacres". Throughout Europe, it "printed on Protestant minds the indelible conviction that Catholicism was a bloody and treacherous religion".

==== Vendee ====
"There were poor girls, completely naked, hanging from tree branches, hands tied behind their backs, after having been raped. It was fortunate that, with the Blues [Republicans] gone, some charitable passersby delivered them from this shameful torment. Elsewhere, in a refinement of barbarism, perhaps without precedent, pregnant women were stretched out and crushed beneath wine presses....Bloody limbs and nursing infants were carried in triumph on the points of bayonets." – Account of the war by a Vendean abbé

In 1986, Reynald Secher argued that the actions of the French republican government during the revolt in the Vendée (1793–1796), a popular mostly Catholic uprising against the anti-clerical Republican government during the French Revolution, was the first modern genocide. Secher's claims caused a minor uproar in France and mainstream authorities rejected Secher's claims.

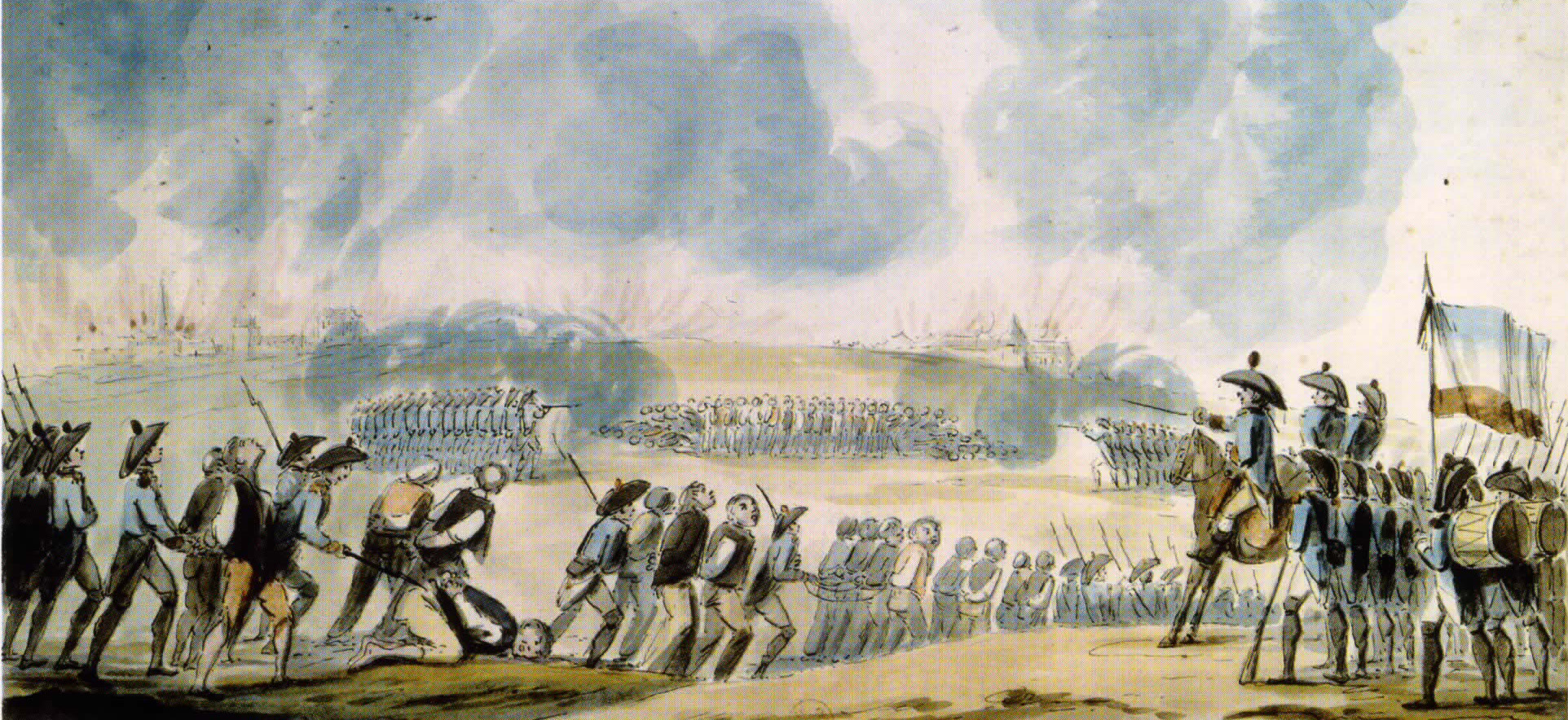
Mass shootings at Nantes, 1793

Timothy Tackett countered that "the Vendée was a tragic civil war with endless horrors committed by both sides—initiated, in fact, by the rebels themselves. The Vendeans were no more blameless than were the republicans. The use of the word genocide is wholly inaccurate and inappropriate." Historians Frank Chalk and Kurt Jonassohn consider the Vendée a case of genocide, while historian Peter McPhee highlights that using Chalk and Jonassohn's definition the Vendée does not fit a case of "one-sided mass killing". Historian Pierre Chaunu called the Vendée the first ideological genocide, linking it to later examples of totalitarian mass killings. Adam Jones estimates that 150,000 Vendeans died in what he also considers a genocide.

=== Polish–Lithuanian Commonwealth ===
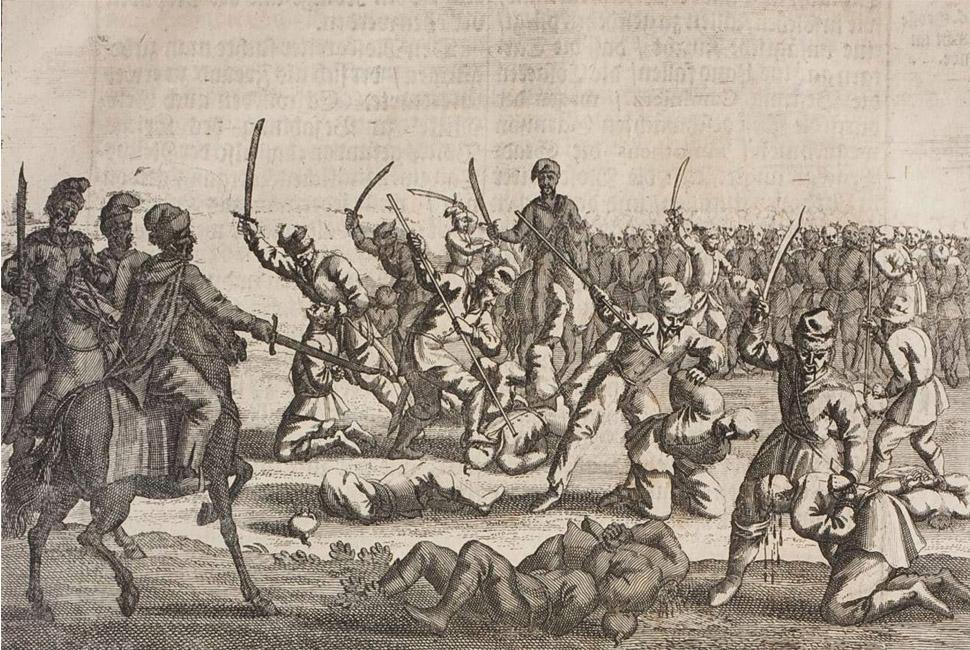
Depiction of the Batih massacre, where 3,000–5,000 Polish captives were killed after the Battle of Batih in 1652.

The Khmelnytsky uprising (also known as the Cossack-Polish War, the Chmielnicki Uprising, or the Khmelnytsky insurrection) was a Cossack rebellion within the Polish–Lithuanian Commonwealth from 1648 to 1657, which led to the creation of a Cossack Hetmanate in Ukrainian lands. Under the command of Hetman Bohdan Khmelnytsky, the Zaporozhian Cossacks, allied themselves with the Crimean Tatars and local peasantry, and fought against the armies and paramilitary forces of the Polish–Lithuanian Commonwealth. The insurgency was accompanied by mass atrocities which the Cossacks committed against the civilian population, especially against the Roman Catholic clergy and the Jews. In Jewish history, the Uprising is known for the concomitant outrages which were committed against the Jews who, in their capacity as leaseholders (arendators), who the peasants saw as their immediate oppressors.

Most of the Jewish communities which existed in the rebellious Hetmanate were devastated in the uprising and the ensuing massacres, but occasionally, a Jewish population was spared, notably after the capture of the town of Brody (the population of which was 70% Jewish). According to the book which is titled History of the Rus, Khmelnytsky's rationale for sparing the Jews of Brody was largely mercantile because Brody was a major trading center and as a result, the Jews who lived there were judged to be useful "for turnovers and profits" and based on this assumption, they were only required to pay "moderate indemnities" in kind.

Although many modern sources still give estimates of Jews killed in the uprising at 100,000 or more, others put the numbers killed at between 40,000 and 100,000, and recent academic studies have argued fatalities were even lower.

A 2003 study by Israeli demographer Shaul Stampfer of Hebrew University dedicated solely to the issue of Jewish casualties in the uprising concludes that 18,000–20,000 Jews were killed of a total population of 40,000. Paul Robert Magocsi states that Jewish chroniclers of the 17th century "provide invariably inflated figures with respect to the loss of life among the Jewish population of Ukraine. The numbers range from 60,000–80,000 (Nathan Hannover) to 100,000 (Sabbatai Cohen), but that "the Israeli scholars Shmuel Ettinger and Bernard D. Weinryb speak instead of the 'annihilation of tens of thousands of Jewish lives', and the Ukrainian-American historian Jarowlaw Pelenski narrows the number of Jewish deaths to between 6,000 and 14,000". Orest Subtelny concludes:

Between 1648 and 1656, tens of thousands of Jews—given the lack of reliable data, it is impossible to establish more accurate figures—were killed by the rebels, and to this day the Khmelnytsky uprising is considered by Jews to be one of the most traumatic events in their history.

=== Ireland ===
==== Tudor colonisation ====
Ben Kiernan details how genocidal massacres were employed as a strategy in the colonisation of Ireland during the 16th century. The historian David Edwards argues that the Tudor colonisation should not be considered a genocide in line with the popular understanding of genocide, but that the process was a partially exterminatory process.

==== War of the Three Kingdoms ====
Towards the end of the War of the Three Kingdoms (1639–1651), the English Rump Parliament sent the New Model Army to Ireland to subdue the Catholic population of the country and take revenge on it and prevent Royalists loyal to Charles II from using Ireland as a base to threaten England from. The force was initially under the command of Oliver Cromwell and later, it was under the command of other parliamentary generals. The Army sought to secure the country, and it also sought to confiscate the lands of Irish families that had participated in the fighting. This policy became a continuation of the Elizabethan policy which encouraged Protestants to settle in Ireland, because the Protestant New Model army's soldiers could be paid with confiscated lands rather than cash.

During the Interregnum (1651–1660), this policy was enhanced with the passage of the Act of Settlement of Ireland in 1652. Its goal was to further the transfer of land from Irish to English hands. The immediate war aims and the longer term policies of the English Parliamentarians resulted in an attempt by the English to transfer the native population to the western fringes to make way for Protestant settlers. during the conquest over 200,000 civilians died due to the destruction of crops, forced displacement, and the mass killing of civilians. The policy of land confiscation and English settlement was reflected in a phrase attributed—without factual foundation—to Cromwell: "To Hell or to Connaught", and the policy has been described as a genocide by some nationalist historians.

=== British Empire ===
==== Great Irish Famine ====
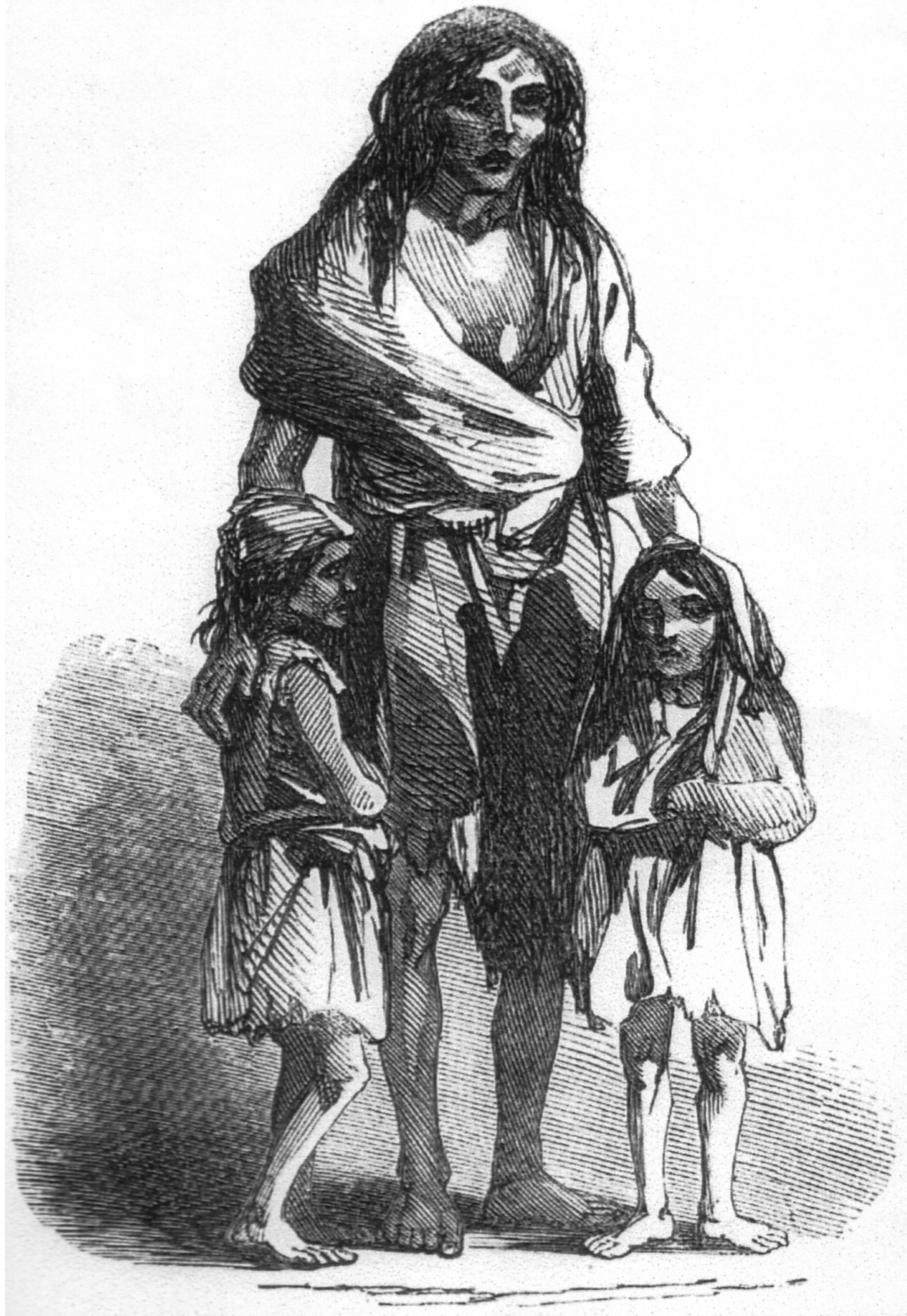
Depiction of Bridget O'Donnel and her children during the Great Famine, from the Illustrated London News, December 1849

During the famine, approximately 1 million people died and a million more people emigrated from Ireland, causing the island's population to fall by between 20% and 25% and leading to the formation of the Irish diaspora. The proximate cause of the famine was a potato disease which is commonly known as potato blight. Although blight ravaged potato crops throughout Europe during the 1840s, the impact and human cost in Ireland – where one-third of the population was entirely dependent on the potato for food – was exacerbated by a host of political, social, and economic factors that remain the subject of historical debate. Contemporary commentators did not believe that the blight was the cause of the mass death, instead, they believed that the mass death was caused by the actions of the British government.

While a small number of historians believe that the Great Famine of Ireland (1845–1852) was a genocide, according to Liam Kennedy, "virtually all historians of Ireland" reject the genocide allegations. Historians Kevin Kenny and Cormac Ó Gráda argue that for a mass-death atrocity to be defined as a genocide, it must include the intentional destruction of a people and that the British government's actions do not meet this requirement. Ó Gráda thinks that a case of neglect is easier to sustain than a case of genocide. Historian Donald Akenson, who has written twenty-four books about Ireland, has said the following about the use of the word 'Holocaust' in relation to Ireland: "When you see it, you know that you are encountering famine-porn. It is inevitably part of a presentation that is historically unbalanced and, like other kinds of pornography, is distinguished by a covert (and sometimes overt) appeal to misanthropy and almost always an incitement to hatred." In debates in the United States, law professors Charles E. Rice and Francis Boyle provided statements, concluding that the British government deliberately pursued a race- and ethnicity-based policy which was aimed at destroying the Irish people and concluding that the policy of mass starvation amounted to genocide per the retrospective application of article 2 of the Genocide Convention.

Writing in 2008, historian Robbie Mcveigh highlighted the fact that while discussions around whether the Great Irish Famine was genocidal in nature have a long history, the tools of genocide analysis were never employed to assess such claims. Scholars highlight the similarity of British policies around and in response to the Irish famine and other cases of famine and starvation in the British empire and colonial regimes, with Mcveigh stating that the other cases "appear not as horrendous imperial incompetence but rather a deliberate administrative policy of genocide", and he calls for a more rigorous investigation of the history of Ireland in relation to the field of genocide studies. Recently, some genocide scholars have supported the description of the famine as a genocide. In 2011, historian Ciaran O'Murchadha said that while the famine did not meet a definition of genocide in that it was the "deliberate, systematic annihilation of an entire ethnic or religious group by mass murder", the case could be made if genocide is considered to include "a deliberate systematic use of an environmental catastrophe to destroy a people under the pretext of engineering social reform". Neysa King has specifically characterised the relief efforts of the Russell administration from late 1846 to 1849 as a genocide, while acknowledging the fact that the roots of the famine lay elsewhere.

Nat Hill, director of research at Genocide Watch, has stated that "While the potato famine may not fit perfectly into the legal and political definitions of 'genocide', it should be given equal consideration in history as an egregious crime against humanity". John Leazer, professor of history at Carthage College, Wisconsin, wrote that the entire debate surrounding the question of genocide serves to oversimplify and obfuscate complex factors behind the actions of the government as a whole and individuals within it.

=== Balkan Wars ===
The Ottoman Muslim genocide during the Balkan Wars was the expulsion and the systematic extermination of Ottoman Muslim civilians which was committed by members of the Balkan League from 1912 to 1913, during the Balkan Wars. In 1912, the Kingdom of Serbia, Kingdom of Greece, Tsardom of Bulgaria and the Kingdom of Montenegro declared war on the Ottomans. The Ottomans quickly lost territory. According to lawyer Geert-Hinrich Ahrens, "the invading armies and Christian insurgents committed a wide range of atrocities upon the Muslim population", with political scientist Dale Tatum describing the massacres that occurred as "acts of genocide". In Kosovo, Albania, and parts of Macedonia, most of the victims were Albanians while in other areas the victims were mostly Turks and Pomaks. A large number of Pomaks in the Rhodopes were forcibly converted to Orthodoxy but later allowed to reconvert, which most of them did. Jews were also targeted in the ensuing violence.

During these wars, hundreds of thousands of Turks and Pomaks fled from their villages and became refugees. The total number of refugees is estimated to be between 400,000 and 813,000. The number of Ottoman civilians who were killed is estimated to range from 732,000 to 1,500,000.

=== Massacres of Albanians in Yugoslavia ===
The massacres of Albanians in the Balkan Wars were perpetrated on several occasions by the Serbian and Montenegrin armies and paramilitaries during the conflicts that occurred in the region between 1912 and 1913. During the 1912–13 First Balkan War, Serbia and Montenegro committed a number of war crimes against the Albanian population after expelling Ottoman Empire forces from present-day Albania, Kosovo, and North Macedonia, which were reported by the European, American and Serbian opposition press. Most of the crimes occurred between October 1912 and the summer of 1913. The goal of the forced expulsions and massacres was statistical manipulation before the London Ambassadors Conference to determine the new Balkan borders. 10% of the population of present-day Kosovo (estimated to be 500,000) were victimised, with between 120,000 and 270,000 Albanians being killed.

== Oceania ==
=== Australia ===
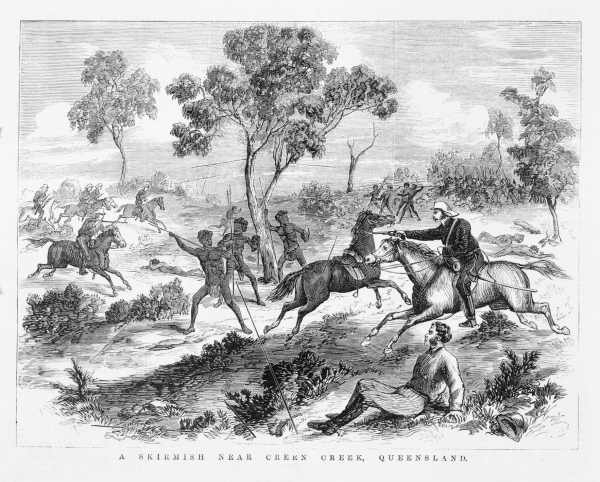
Australian frontier wars

According to one report published in 2009, in 1789 the British deliberately spread smallpox from the First Fleet to counter overwhelming native tribes near Sydney in New South Wales. In his book An Indelible Stain, Henry Reynolds described this act as genocide. However the majority of scholars disagree that the initial smallpox was the result of deliberate biological warfare and have suggested other causes.

The Queensland Aboriginal genocide refers to the Queensland frontier that represented the single bloodiest colonial frontier in Australia. Thus the records of Queensland document the most frequent reports of shootings and massacres of indigenous people, the three deadliest massacres on white settlers, the most disreputable frontier police force, and the highest number of white victims to frontier violence on record in any Australian colony. Thus some sources have characterised these events as a Queensland Aboriginal genocide.

The Black War was a period of conflict between British colonists and aboriginal Tasmanians in Van Diemen's Land (now Tasmania) in the early 19th century. The conflict, in combination with introduced diseases and other factors, had such devastating impacts on the aboriginal Tasmanian population that it was reported that they had been exterminated. Historian Geoffrey Blainey wrote that by 1830, "Disease had killed most of them but warfare and private violence had also been devastating." Smallpox was the principal cause of aboriginal deaths in the 19th century.

Lemkin and most other comparative genocide scholars present the extinction of the Tasmanian aborigines as a textbook example of a genocide, while the majority of Australian experts are more circumspect. Detailed studies of the events surrounding the extinction have raised questions about some of the details and interpretations in earlier histories. Curthoys concluded, "It is time for a more robust exchange between genocide and Tasmanian historical scholarship if we are to understand better what did happen in Tasmania."

On the Australian continent during the colonial period (1788–1901), the population of 500,000–750,000 aboriginal Australians was reduced to fewer than 50,000. Most were devastated by the introduction of alien diseases after contact with Europeans, while perhaps 20,000 were killed by massacres and fighting with colonists.

Sir Ronald Wilson, a former president of Australia's Human Rights Commission, stated that Australia's program in which 20,000–25,000 Aboriginal children were forcibly separated from their natural families, known as the stolen generations, was genocide. He argued, using statements of intent by the architects of the program, that it was intended to cause the Aboriginal people to die out. The program ran from 1900 to 1969. The nature and extent of the removals have been disputed within Australia, with opponents questioning the findings contained in the Commission report and asserting that the size of the Stolen Generation had been exaggerated. The intent and effects of the government policy were also disputed.

=== New Zealand ===
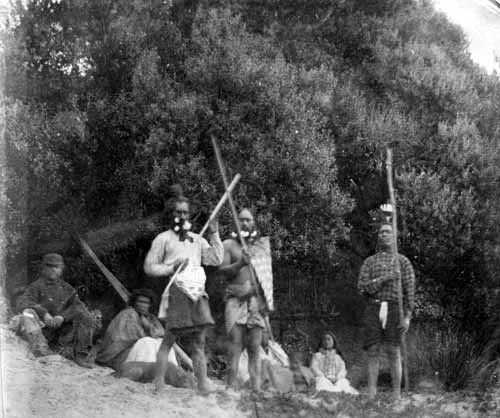
Moriori people in the late 19th century

In the early 19th century, Ngāti Mutunga and Ngāti Tama (local Māori tribes) massacred the Moriori people. The Moriori were the indigenous people of the Chatham Islands (Rekohu in Moriori, Wharekauri in Māori), east of the New Zealand archipelago in the Pacific Ocean. These people lived by a code of non-violence and passive resistance (see Nunuku-whenua), which led to their near-extinction at the hands of Taranaki Māori invaders in the 1830s.

In 1835, some Ngāti Mutunga and Ngāti Tama from the Taranaki region of North Island invaded the Chathams. On 19 November 1835, the Rodney, a European ship hired by the Māori, arrived carrying 500 Māori armed with guns, clubs, and axes, followed by another ship with 400 more warriors on 5 December 1835. They proceeded to enslave some Moriori and kill and cannibalise others. "Parties of warriors armed with muskets, clubs and tomahawks, led by their chiefs, walked through Moriori tribal territories and settlements without warning, permission or greeting. If the districts were wanted by the invaders, they curtly informed the inhabitants that their land had been taken and the Moriori living there were now vassals."

A council of Moriori elders was convened at the settlement called Te Awapatiki. Despite knowing of the Māori predilection for killing and eating the conquered, and despite the admonition by some of the elder chiefs that the principle of Nunuku was not appropriate now, two chiefs—Tapata and Torea—declared that "the law of Nunuku was not a strategy for survival, to be varied as conditions changed; it was a moral imperative." A Moriori survivor recalled: "[The Maori] commenced to kill us like sheep.... [We] were terrified, fled to the bush, concealed ourselves in holes underground, and in any place to escape our enemies. It was of no avail; we were discovered and killed—men, women and children indiscriminately." A Māori conqueror explained, "We took possession... in accordance with our customs and we caught all the people. Not one escaped..."

After the invasion, Moriori were forbidden to marry Moriori, or to have children with each other. All became slaves of the invaders. Many Moriori women had children by their Maori masters. A small number of Moriori women eventually married either Maori or European men. Some were taken from the Chathams and never returned. Only 101 Moriori out of a population of about 2,000 were left alive by 1862. Although the last Moriori of unmixed ancestry, Tommy Solomon, died in 1933, several thousand mixed-ancestry Moriori are alive today.

== See also ==
- Accusation in a mirror
- Anti-communist mass killings
- Anti-Mongolianism
- Black genocide in the United States – the notion that African Americans have been subjected to genocide throughout their history because of racism against African Americans, an aspect of racism in the United States
- Crimes against humanity
- Criticism of communist party rule
- Democide
- Ethnic cleansing
- Ethnic conflict
- Ethnic violence
- Ethnocentrism
- Ethnocide
- Far-left politics
- Far-right politics
- Far-right subcultures
- Genocide denial
- Genocide recognition politics
- Genocide of Christians by the Islamic State
- Genocide of indigenous peoples
- Genocide of Yazidis by the Islamic State
- Hate crime
- Hate group
- Hate media
- Hate speech
- Hate studies
- Iraqi Turkmen genocide
- List of ethnic cleansing campaigns
- List of genocides
- Mass killings under communist regimes
- Mass racial violence in the United States
- Native American genocide in the United States — the notion that Native Americans have been subjected to genocide because of racism against them, another aspect of racism in the United States
- Nativism (politics)
- Persecution of Shias by the Islamic State
- Political cleansing of population – an aspect of political violence
- Population transfer
- Racism
- Religious intolerance
- Religious discrimination
- Religious persecution
- Religious violence
- Sectarian violence
- Supremacism
- Terrorism
- War crime
- Xenophobia

== Sources ==
- Aboona, Hirmis (2008). Assyrians, Kurds, and Ottomans: intercommunal relations on the periphery of the Ottoman Empire. Cambria Press. ISBN 978-1-60497-583-3.
- Adalian, Rouben Paul (2010). Historical Dictionary of Armenia (2nd ed.). Lanham, MD: Scarecrow Press. ISBN 978-0-8108-7450-3.
- ——— (2012). "The Armenian genocide". In Totten, Samuel; Parsons, William S. (eds.). Century of Genocide. Routledge. pp. 117–156. ISBN 978-0415871914.
- Adam, Andrew E. (2018). Thomas Cochrane and the Dragon Throne: Confronting disease, distrust and murderous rebellion in Imperial China. ISBN 9780281080373.
- Adhikari, Mohamed (2010). The Anatomy of a South African Genocide: The Extermination of the Cape San Peoples. University of Cape Town Press. ISBN 978-1-919895-44-4.
- ——— (2010). "A total extinction confidently hoped for: the destruction of Cape San society under Dutch colonial rule, 1700 –1795". Journal of Genocide Research. 12 (1–2): 19–44. doi:10.1080/14623528.2010.508274. PMID 20941880.
- ——— (2023). ""Now We Are Natives": The Genocide of the Beothuk People and the Politics of "Extinction" in Newfoundland". In Jacob, Franj; Göllnitz, Martin (eds.). Genocide and Mass Violence in the Age of Extremes. Vol. 6. DeGruyter. pp. 115–136.
- ——— (2023). "Settler Genocides of San Peoples of Southern Africa, c.1700–c.1940". In Blackhawk, Ned; Kiernan, Ben; Madley, Benjamin; Taylor, Rebe (eds.). The Cambridge World History of Genocide. Vol. II: Genocide in the Indigenous, Early Modern and Imperial Worlds, from c.1535 to World War One. Cambridge University Press. pp. 69–96. doi:10.1017/9781108765480. ISBN 978-1-108-76548-0.
- Adhikari, Mohamed; Carmichael, Cathie; Jones, Adam; Kapila, Shruti; Naimark, Norman; Weitz, Eric D. (2018). "Genocide and Global and/or World History: Reflections". Journal of Genocide Research. 20 (1): 134–153. doi:10.1080/14623528.2017.1363476. S2CID 80081680.
- Ahmed, Akbar (2013). The Thistle and the Drone: How America's War on Terror Became a Global War on Tribal Islam. Washington, D.C.: Brookings Institution Press. ISBN 978-0-8157-2379-0.
- Ahrens, Geert-Hinrich (2007). Diplomacy on the Edge: Containment of Ethnic Conflict and the Minorities Working Group of the Conferences on Yugoslavia. Woodrow Wilson Center Press. ISBN 9780801885570.
- Akçam, Taner (2006). A Shameful Act: The Armenian Genocide and the Question of Turkish Responsibility. New York: Metropolitan Books. ISBN 978-0-8050-7932-6.
- Akhtar, Zia (2010). "Canadian Genocide and Official Culpability". International Criminal Law Review. 10 (1): 111–135. doi:10.1163/157181209x12584562670938.
- Albarenga, Pablo (10 November 2017). "Where did Uruguay's indigenous population go?". El País. Archived from the original on 20 May 2024.
- Allenova, Olga (6 June 2011). "Eto namerennoye unichtozheniye Naroda" Это намеренное уничтожение народа [This is the deliberate destruction of the people]. Kommersant (in Russian). Archived from the original on 4 March 2024.
- Andermann, Jens (2002). "Argentine Literature and the 'Conquest of the Desert', 1872–1896: Violence". Birkbeck, University of London. Archived from the original on 2 March 2024.
- Anderson, Warwick (1 December 2013). "Conquest and Pestilence in the Early Spanish Philippines". Asian Studies Review. 37 (4): 603–604. doi:10.1080/10357823.2013.855120. ISSN 1035-7823. S2CID 146929132.
- Anderson, William L. (1992). Cherokee Removal: Before and After. University of Georgia Press. pp. 75–93. ISBN 978-0-8203-1482-2.
- Angold, Michael (2006). O'Mahony, Anthony (ed.). Cambridge History of Christianity. Vol. 5. Eastern Christianity. Cambridge University Press. ISBN 978-0-521-81113-2.
- Annett, Kevin D. (2001). Hidden From History: The Untold Story of the Genocide of Aboriginal Peoples by the Church and State in Canada (PDF). The Truth Commission into the Genocide in Canada. Archived (PDF) from the original on 9 July 2014.
- Aquino, Belinda A.; Alegado, D. T. (1993). The Age of Discovery: Impact on Philippine Culture and Society (Second ed.). Hawaii Correctional Industries.
- Aufderheide, Arthur C.; Rodríguez-Martín, Conrado; Langsjoen, Odin (1998). The Cambridge Encyclopedia of Human Paleopathology. Cambridge University Press. ISBN 0-521-55203-6.
- Bachmann, Klaus; Kemp, Gerhard (30 July 2021). "Was Quashing the Maji-Maji Uprising Genocide? An Evaluation of Germany's Conduct through the Lens of International Criminal Law". Holocaust and Genocide Studies. 35 (2): 235–249. doi:10.1093/hgs/dcab032.
- Baldry, Hannah; McKeon, Alisa; McDougal, Scott (2015). "Queensland's Frontier Killing Times – Facing Up to Genocide". QUT Law Review. 15 (1): 92–113. doi:10.5204/qutlr.v15i1.583 (inactive 10 July 2026). ISSN 2201-7275. Archived from the original on 15 March 2016.
- Barry, Ellen (20 May 2011). "Georgia Says Russia Committed Genocide in 19th Century". The New York Times. Archived from the original on 3 May 2023.
- "Columbus 'sparked a genocide'". BBC News. 12 October 2003. Archived from the original on 15 July 2023.
- "Turkey accuses France of genocide in colonial Algeria". BBC News. 23 December 2011. Archived from the original on 20 January 2024.
- Bearak, Max (11 October 2019). "'A place of ghosts:' Ethiopia opens controversial palace to a divided public". The Washington Post. Archived from the original on 19 October 2020.
- Beede, Benjamin R. (2013). The War of 1898 and U.S. Interventions, 1898-1934: An Encyclopedia. Routledge. ISBN 978-1-136-74691-8.
- Benedict, Philip (1978). "The Saint Bartholomew's Massacres in the Provinces". The Historical Journal. 21 (2): 205–225. doi:10.1017/S0018246X00000510. JSTOR 2638258. S2CID 159715479.
- Berger, Stefan; Donovan, Mark; Passmore, Kevin (1999). Writing National Histories: Western Europe Since 1800. Routledge. ISBN 978-0-415-16427-6.
- Bermudez, J. (1543). The Portuguese expedition to Abyssinia in 1541–1543 as narrated by Castanhoso. Рипол Классик.
- Berresford Ellis, Peter (2007). Eyewitness to Irish History. John Wiley & Sons. ISBN 978-0-470-05312-6.
- Bhabha, Jacqueline; Matache, Margareta (2021). Time for Reparations: A Global Perspective. United States: University of Pennsylvania Press. p. 257. ISBN 9780812225044.
- Blackhawk, Ned (2023). "'The Centrality of Dispossession': Native American Genocide and Settler Colonialism". In Blackhawk, Ned; Kiernan, Ben; Madley, Benjamin; Taylor, Rebe (eds.). The Cambridge World History of Genocide. Vol. II: Genocide in the Indigenous, Early Modern and Imperial Worlds, from c. 1535 to World War One. Cambridge University Press. pp. 23–45. doi:10.1017/9781108765480. ISBN 978-1-108-76548-0.
- Blackhawk, Ned (2023). "The Destruction of Wendake (Huronia), 1647–1652". In Blackhawk, Ned; Kiernan, Ben; Madley, Benjamin; Taylor, Rebe (eds.). The Cambridge World History of Genocide. Vol. II: Genocide in the Indigenous, Early Modern and Imperial Worlds, from c.1535 to World War One. Cambridge University Press. pp. 243–266. doi:10.1017/9781108765480. ISBN 978-1-108-76548-0.
- Blainey, Geoffrey (1980). A Land Half Won. Macmillan. ISBN 978-0-333-29949-4.
- Blick, Jeremy P. (2001). "The Iroquois practice of genocidal warfare (1534-1787)". Journal of Genocide Research. 3 (3): 405–429. doi:10.1080/14623520120097215. S2CID 71358963.
- Bloxham, Donald; Moses, A. Dirk, eds. (2010). The Oxford Handbook of Genocide Studies. Oxford University Press. doi:10.1093/oxfordhb/9780199232116.001.0001. ISBN 978-0-19-923211-6.
- Bonwick, James (1870). The Last of the Tasmanians; or, The Black War of Van Diemen's Land. London: Sampson Low, Son, & Marston.
- Boissevain, Ethel (Spring 1981). "Whatever Became of the New England Indians Shipped to Bermuda to be Sold as Slaves". Man in the Northwest. 11: 103–114.
- Braun, Harald E. (2023). "Genocidal Massacres in the Spanish Conquest of the Americas: Xaragua, Cholula and Toxcatl, 1503–1519". In Kiernan, Ben; Lemos, T. M.; Taylor, Tristan S. (eds.). The Cambridge World History of Genocide. Vol. I: Genocide in the Ancient, Medieval and Premodern Worlds. Cambridge University Press. pp. 622–647. doi:10.1017/9781108655989. ISBN 978-1-108-65598-9.
- Bridgman, Jon M. (1981). The Revolt of the Hereros. University of California Press. ISBN 978-0-520-04113-4 – via Google Books.
- Brophy, David (2023). "The Qing Extermination of the Zünghars: An Early Modern Genocide?". In Blackhawk, Ned; Kiernan, Ben; Madley, Benjamin; Taylor, Rebe (eds.). The Cambridge World History of Genocide. Vol. II: Genocide in the Indigenous, Early Modern and Imperial Worlds, from c.1535 to World War One. Cambridge University Press. pp. 292–311. doi:10.1017/9781108765480. ISBN 978-1-108-76548-0.
- Brown, Dee (2001) [1970]. "War Comes to the Cheyenne". Bury my heart at Wounded Knee. Macmillan. ISBN 978-0-8050-6634-0.
- Bulatovich, Alexander K. (1993) [1897, 1900]. Ethiopia through Russian Eyes. Archived from the original on 8 February 2012 – via www.samizdat.com.
- Bulcha, Mekuria (2005). "Genocidal Violence in the Making of Nation and State in Ethiopia". African Sociological Review / Revue Africaine de Sociologie. 9 (2). CODESRIA: 1–54. doi:10.4314/asr.v9i2.23257. JSTOR afrisocirevi.9.2.1.
- Bullough, Oliver (2010). Let Our Fame be Great: journeys among the defiant people of the Caucasus. London: Allen Lane.
- Burnett, Ian (2013). East Indies. Sydney: Rosenberg Publishing. ISBN 9781922013873.
- Camcastle, Cara (2005). The More Moderate Side of Joseph De Maistre: Views on Political Liberty And Political Economy. McGill-Queen's University Press. ISBN 0-7735-2976-4.
- Canclini, Arnoldo (1980). Congresso nacional de Historia sobre la Conquista del desierto [National Congress of History on the Conquest of the Desert] (in Spanish). Academia Nacional de la Historia (Argentina).
- Canny, Nicholas (2023). "The English Conquest of Ireland, c. 1530–c. 1650". In Kiernan, Ben; Blackhawk, Ned; Madley, Benjamin; Taylor, Rebe (eds.). The Cambridge World History of Genocide. Vol. II: Genocide in the Indigenous, Early Modern and Imperial Worlds, from c. 1535 to World War One. Cambridge University Press. pp. 139–162. doi:10.1017/9781108765480. ISBN 978-1-108-48643-9.
- Carroll, Rory (13 January 2022). "Argentinian founding father recast as genocidal murderer". The Guardian. Archived from the original on 7 June 2024.
- Carter, Samuel, III (1976). Cherokee sunset: A nation betrayed: a narrative of travail and triumph, persecution and exile. New York: Doubleday. ISBN 978-0385067355.
- "Judaism Timeline 1618–1770". CBS News. 2003. Archived from the original on 27 December 2023.
- Cesarani, David; Kavanaugh, Sarah (2004). Holocaust: Critical Concepts in Historical Studies. Psychology Press. ISBN 978-0-415-27510-1.
- Chadwick, Henry; Evans, G. R. (1987). Atlas of the Christian church. London: Macmillan. ISBN 978-0-333-44157-2.
- Chalk, Frank Robert; Jonassohn, Kurt (1990). The History and Sociology of Genocide: Analyses and Case Studies. Yale University Press. ISBN 978-0-300-04446-1.
- Chapman, Anne (2010). European Encounters with the Yamana People of Cape Horn, Before and After Darwin (1st ed.). Cambridge University Press. ISBN 978-052151379-1.
- Charles, Grant; DeGane, Mike (2013). "Student-to-Student Abuse in the Indian Residential Schools in Canada: Setting the Stage for Further Understanding". Child & Youth Services. 34 (4): 343–359. doi:10.1080/0145935X.2013.859903. S2CID 144148882.
- Charters (1839). "Notices of the Cape And Southern Africa, Since The Appointment, As Governor, Of Major-Gen. Sir Geo. Napier". United Service Journal and Naval and Military Magazine. Vol. Part III. London: W. Clowes and Son.
- Chem, A. (2016). "The Filipino Genocide". Historical Perspective: Santa Clara University Undergraduate Journal of History, Series II.
- Chesneaux, Jean (1973). Peasant Revolts in China, 1840–1949. Translated by Curwen, C. A. New York: W. W. Norton.
- Chrisafis, Angelique (23 December 2011). "Turkey accuses France of genocide in Algeria". The Guardian. Archived from the original on 26 March 2023.
- Clarence-Smith, W. G. (1989). The Economics of the Indian Ocean Slave Trade in the Nineteenth Century. Psychology Press. ISBN 978-0-7146-3359-6.
- Clark, Christopher (2006). Iron Kingdom: The Rise and Downfall of Prussia 1600–1947. Cambridge: Belknap Press of Harvard. ISBN 978-0-674-02385-7.
- Clarke, Michael Edmund (2004). In the Eye of Power: China and Xinjiang from the Qing Conquest to the 'New Great Game' for Central Asia, 1759–2004 (PDF) (Thesis). Griffith University, Brisbane: Dept. of International Business & Asian Studies. Archived from the original (PDF) on 10 April 2008.
- Cleveland, William L. (2000). A History of the Modern Middle East (2nd ed.). Boulder, CO: Westview Press. ISBN 0-8133-3489-6.
- Clodfelter, Micheal (2002). Warfare and Armed Conflicts: A Statistical Reference to Casualty and Other Figures, 1500–1999. McFarland & Company.
- Conley, Bridget; de Waal, Alex (2023). "Genocide, Starvation and Famine". In Kiernan, Ben; Lemos, Tracy Maria; Taylor, Tristan S. (eds.). The Cambridge World History of Genocide. Vol. I: Genocide in the Ancient, Medieval and Premodern Worlds. Cambridge University Press. pp. 127–149. doi:10.1017/9781108655989.007. ISBN 978-1-108-49353-6.
- Connor, John (2002). The Australian Frontier Wars, 1788–1838. UNSW Press.
- Conrad, Margaret (2008). History of the Canadian Peoples. Vol. 1 (Fifth ed.). Pearson Canada. ISBN 978-0321524300.
- Coogan, Tim Pat (2002). The Troubles: Ireland's Ordeal and the Search for Peace. Palgrave Macmillan. ISBN 978-0-312-29418-2.
- Cook, Noble David (1998). Born to Die: Disease and New World Conquest, 1492–1650. Cambridge University Press. ISBN 978-0-521-62730-6.
- Cooper, Allan D. (3 August 2006). "Reparations for the Herero Genocide: Defining the limits of international litigation". African Affairs. 106 (422): 113–126. doi:10.1093/afraf/adl005.
- Corn, Charles (1998). The Scents of Eden: A Narrative of the Spice Trade. New York City: Kodansha International. ISBN 9781568362021.
- Cowan, Jill (19 June 2019). "'It's Called Genocide': Newsom Apologizes to the State's Native Americans". The New York Times. Archived from the original on 6 July 2019.
- Crowe, David M. (2004). A History of the Gypsies of Eastern Europe and Russia. Palgrave Macmillan. ISBN 0-312-08691-1.
- ——— (2013). "War Crimes and Genocide in History". In Crowe, David M. (ed.). Crimes of State Past and Present: Government-Sponsored Atrocities and International Legal Responses. London; New York: Routledge. ISBN 978-1317986812.
- Cruickshank, Joanna; McKinnon, Crystal (2023). "Australia's Stolen Generations, 1914–2021". In Kiernan, Ben; Lower, Wendy; Naimark, Norman; Straus, Scott (eds.). The Cambridge World History of Genocide. Vol. III: Genocide in the Contemporary Era, 1914–2020. Cambridge University Press. pp. 93–117. doi:10.1017/9781108767118. ISBN 978-1-108-48707-8.
- Curthoys, Ann (2010). "Genocide in Tasmania: The History of an Idea". In Moses, A. Dirk (ed.). Empire, Colony, Genocide: Conquest, Occupation, and Subaltern Resistance in World History. Berghahn Books. pp. 229–252. ISBN 978-1-84545-452-4. JSTOR j.ctt9qd5qb.13.
- Davis, Mike (2001). Late Victorian Holocausts: El Nino Famines and the Making of the Third World. London: Verso Books. ISBN 978-1859843826.
- Deljo, Abas (2014). tarikh bastani cpehzareh cpeha تاریخ باستانی هزاره ها [Ancient history of millennia] (in Persian). Kabul: انتشارات امیری. ISBN 978-9936801509.
- d'Errico, Peter (2001). "Jeffrey Amherst and Smallpox Blankets". Archived from the original on 5 April 2024.
- Dharmowijono, W. W. (2009). Van koelies, klontongs en kapiteins: het beeld van de Chinezen in Indisch-Nederlands literair proza 1880–1950 [Of Coolies, Klontong, and Captains: The Image of the Chinese in Indonesian-Dutch Literature 1880–1950] (Doctorate in Humanities thesis) (in Dutch). Amsterdam: University of Amsterdam.
- Dhont, Frank (2023). "Genocide in the Spice Islands: The Dutch East India Company and the Destruction of the Banda Archipelago Civilisation". In Kiernan, Ben; Blackhawk, Ned; Madley, Benjamin; Taylor, Rebe (eds.). The Cambridge World History of Genocide. Vol. II: Genocide in the Indigenous, Early Modern and Imperial Worlds, from c.1535 to World War One. Cambridge University Press. pp. 186–214. doi:10.1017/9781108765480. ISBN 978-1-108-48643-9.
- Diamond, Jared (1997). Guns, Germs, and Steel: The Fates of Human Societies. New York: W. W. Norton and Company.
- Division of Intercourse and Education (1914). Report of the International Commission to Inquire into the Causes and Conduct of the Balkan War. Washington, D.C: Carnegie Endowment for International Peace.
- Dixon, David (2005). Never Come to Peace Again: Pontiac's Uprising and the Fate of the British Empire in North America. University of Oklahoma Press. ISBN 978-0-8061-3656-1.
- Dorney, John (10 January 2014). "The Eleven Years War 1641–52 – A Brief Overview". The Irish Story. Archived from the original on 9 October 2024.
- Dorosh, Paul; Rashid, Shahidur (2012). Food and Agriculture in Ethiopia: Progress and Policy Challenges. University of Pennsylvania Press. ISBN 978-0-8122-4529-5.
- Dowd, Gregory Evans (2004). War under Heaven: Pontiac, the Indian Nations, and the British Empire. Johns Hopkins University Press. ISBN 978-0-8018-7892-3.
- Dunbar-Ortiz, Roxanne (2014). An Indigenous Peoples' History of the United States. Beacon Press.
- ——— (12 May 2016). "Yes, Native Americans Were the Victims of Genocide". History News Network. Archived from the original on 2 April 2024.
- Edwards, David (2015). "Tudor Ireland: Anglicisation, mass killing, and security". In Carmichael, Cathie; Maguire, Richard C. (eds.). The Routledge History of Genocide. Routledge. pp. 23–37. ISBN 978-0367867065.
- Ehle, John (1989). Trials of Tears: The Rise and Fall of the Cherokee Nation. Anchor Books. ISBN 978-0-385-23954-7.
- Ehsassi, Ali; El-Khoury, Fayçal (October 2024). "Enduring and Overcoming: The Struggle of the Hazaras in Afghanistan" (PDF). 44th Parliament, 1st Session. Archived from the original (PDF) on 20 December 2024.
- d'Errico, Peter (2008). "ASCII text of Amherst to Bouquet, dated 16 July 1763; microfilm reel 34/41, item 114". Archived from the original on 12 August 2024.
- Faber-Jonkers, Leonor (2023). "'Rivers of Blood and Rivers of Money': The Herero and Nama Genocides in German Southwest Africa, 1904–1908". In Blackhawk, Ned; Kiernan, Ben; Madley, Benjamin; Taylor, Rebe (eds.). The Cambridge World History of Genocide. Vol. II: Genocide in the Indigenous, Early Modern and Imperial Worlds, from c.1535 to World War One. Cambridge University Press. pp. 634–656. doi:10.1017/9781108765480. ISBN 978-1-108-76548-0.
- Faculty of Law (2000). Aggression Against Yugoslavia Correspondence. University of Belgrade. ISBN 978-86-80763-91-0.
- Féhér, Ferenc (1990). The French Revolution and the birth of modernity. University of California Press.
- Fernández, Cacho (May 2005). "Civilización o genocidio, un debate que nunca se cierra" [Civilization or genocide, a debate that never ends]. Qollasuyu Tawaintisuyu Indymedia (in Spanish). Archived from the original on 16 May 2005.
- Fernández-Armesto, F.; Wilson, D. (1996). Reformation: Christianity and the World 1500–2000. London: Bantam Press. ISBN 0-593-02749-3.
- Field, Henry (1951). "Appendix A: A visit to the Yezidis in 1843 by Ilya Berezin". The Anthropology of Iraq. Archived from the original on 4 August 2023 – via iiif.lib.harvard.edu.
- Flood, Josephine (2006). The Original Australians: Story of the Aboriginal People. Allen & Unwin.
- Fogarty, Philippa (6 June 2008). "Recognition at last for Japan's Ainu". BBC News. Archived from the original on 27 June 2024.
- Forbath, Peter (1977). The River Congo: The Discovery, Exploration and Exploitation of the World's Most Dramatic Rivers. Harper & Row. ISBN 978-0-06-122490-4.
- Forde, James (2020). The Early Haitian State and the Question of Political Legitimacy: American and British Representations of Haiti, 1804—1824. Springer Nature. ISBN 978-3-030-52608-5.
- Freeman, Michael (June 1995). "Puritans and Pequots: The Question of Genocide". New England Quarterly. 68 (2): 278–293. doi:10.2307/366259. JSTOR 366259.
- Friedrichsmeyer, Sara; Lennox, Sara; Zantop, Susanne (1998). The Imperialist Imagination: German Colonialism and Its Legacy. University of Michigan Press. ISBN 978-0-472-06682-7.
- Gallois, William (2023). "The Genocidal French Conquest of Algeria, 1830–1847". In Blackhawk, Ned; Kiernan, Ben; Madley, Benjamin; Taylor, Rebe (eds.). The Cambridge World History of Genocide. Vol. II: Genocide in the Indigenous, Early Modern and Imperial Worlds, from c.1535 to World War One. Cambridge University Press. pp. 361–382. doi:10.1017/9781108765480. ISBN 978-1-108-76548-0.
- Gangopadhyay, Partha (2016). "Economic Foundations of Religious Killings and Genocide with Special Reference to Pakistan, 1978–2012". In Anderton, Charles H.; Brauer, Jurgen (eds.). Economic Aspects of Genocides, Other Mass Atrocities, and Their Prevention. Oxford University Press. pp. 510–535. ISBN 978-0-19-937829-6.
- Garber, Zev; Zuckerman, Bruce (2004). Double Takes: Thinking and Rethinking Issues of Modern Judaism in Ancient Contexts. University Press of America. ISBN 0-7618-2894-X.
- Gardiner, Lion (1897). "Relation of the Pequot Warres". History of the Pequot War: The Contemporary Accounts of Mason, Underhill, Vincent, and Gardiner. Cleveland.
- Gaunt, D.; Beṯ-Şawoce, J. (2006). Massacres, resistance, protectors: Muslim-Christian relations in Eastern Anatolia during World War I. Gorgias Press. ISBN 978-1-59333-301-0.
- Gaunt, David (2009). "The Assyrian Genocide of 1915". Assyrian genocide Research Center. Archived from the original on 4 June 2023.
- Gellately, Robert; Kiernan, Ben (2003). The Specter of Genocide: Mass Murder in Historical Perspective. Cambridge: Cambridge University Press. ISBN 978-0-521-52750-7.
- Gemeda, Eshete (2012). African Egalitarian Values and Indigenous Genres: A Comparative Approach to the Functional and Contextual Studies of Oromo National Literature in a Contemporary Perspective. LIT Verlag Münster. ISBN 978-3-643-90233-7.
- Geraci, Robert (2008). "Genocidal Impulses and Fantasies in Imperial Russia". In Moses, A. Dirk (ed.). Empire, Colony, Genocide: Conquest, Occupation, and Subaltern Resistance in World History. Berghahn Books. pp. 343–371. ISBN 9781845454524. JSTOR j.ctt9qd5qb.18.
- Gerlach, Christian (2010). Extremely Violent Societies: Mass Violence in the Twentieth-Century World. Cambridge University Press. ISBN 978-1-139-49351-2 – via Google Books.
- Geshov, Ivan Evstratiev (1919). La genèse de la guerre mondiale: la débâcle de l'alliance balkanique [The Genesis of World War: The Debacle of the Balkan Alliance] (in French). P. Haupt.
- Gigoux, Carlos (2022). ""Condemned to Disappear": Indigenous Genocide in Tierra del Fuego" (PDF). Journal of Genocide Research. 24 (1): 1–22. doi:10.1080/14623528.2020.1853359. Archived from the original (PDF) on 3 June 2024.
- Gilbert, Martin (1999). Holocaust Journey: Traveling in Search of the Past. Columbia University Press. ISBN 0-231-10965-2.
- Gill, Peter (2010). Famine and Foreigners: Ethiopia Since Live Aid. Oxford: Oxford University Press. ISBN 978-0-19-161431-6.
- Girard, Philippe (2005). "Caribbean genocide: racial war in Haiti, 1802–4". Patterns of Prejudice. 39 (2: Colonial Genocide): 138–161. doi:10.1080/00313220500106196. ISSN 0031-322X. S2CID 145204936.
- Glynn, Ian; Glynn, Jenifer (2004). The Life and Death of Smallpox. New York: Cambridge University Press.
- Goble, Paul (15 July 2005). "Circassians demand Russian apology for 19th century genocide". Radio Free Europe / Radio Liberty. Archived from the original on 5 January 2007.
- Goldberg, David Theo; Solomos, John (2002). A Companion to Racial and Ethnic Studies. Blackwell Publishing. ISBN 0-631-20616-7.
- Gough, Hugh (1987). "Genocide & the Bicentenary: the French Revolution and the revenge of the Vendée". Historical Journal. 30 (4): 977–988. doi:10.1017/S0018246X00022433.
- Greenberg, Jon (18 March 2014). "Jon Stewart: Slave trade caused 5 million deaths". Pundit Fact. Archived from the original on 1 April 2023.
- Grenke, Arthur (2005). God, Greed, and Genocide: The Holocaust Through the Centuries. New Academia Publishing, LLC. ISBN 978-0-9767042-0-1.
- Grunow, Tristan R.; Nakamura, Fuyubi; Hirano, Katsuya; Ishihara, Mai; Lewallen, Ann-Elise; Lightfoot, Sheryl; Mayunkiki; Medak-Saltzman, Danika; Williams-Davidson, Terri-Lynn; Yahata, Tomoe (2019). "Hokkaidō 150: Settler Colonialism and Indigeneity in Modern Japan and Beyond". Critical Asian Studies. 51 (4): 597–636. doi:10.1080/14672715.2019.1665291.
- Haberland, Eike (1983). "An Amharic manuscript on the mythical history of the Adi kyaz (Dizi, south-west Ethiopia)". Bulletin of the School of Oriental and African Studies. 46 (2). Cambridge University Press: 240–257. doi:10.1017/S0041977X00078836.
- Haley, James L. (1981). Apaches: A History and Culture Portrait. University of Oklahoma Press. ISBN 0806129786.
- Hanson, Victor (2007). Carnage and Culture: Landmark Battles in the Rise to Western Power. Knopf Doubleday Publishing Group. ISBN 978-0-307-42518-8.
- Harambour, Alberto (2019). "'There Cannot be Civilisation and Barbarism on the Island': Civilian-driven Violence and the Genocide of the Selkʼnam People of Tierra del Fuego". In Adhikari, Mohamed (ed.). Civilian-Driven Violence and the Genocide of Indigenous Peoples in Settler Societies. Routledge. pp. 165–187. doi:10.4324/9781003015550-7. ISBN 9781003015550. Archived from the original on 21 November 2023.
- Hardenburg, Walter (1912). The Putumayo, the Devil's Paradise; Travels in the Peruvian Amazon Region and an Account of the Atrocities Committed Upon the Indians Therein. London: Fisher Unwin – via Project Gutenberg.
- Harring, Sidney L. (2021). "'Shooting a Black Duck': Genocidal Settler Violence against Indigenous Peoples and the Creation of Canada". In Adhikari, Mohamed (ed.). Civilian-Driven Violence and the Genocide of Indigenous Peoples in Settler Societies. Routledge. ISBN 978-1-003-01555-0.
- Hassen, Mohammed (2002). "Conquest, Tyranny, and Ethnocide against the Oromo: A Historical Assessment of Human Rights Conditions in Ethiopia, c. 1880s–2002". Northeast African Studies. 9 (3 Special Issue: The Oromo in Ethiopian Studies: Confronting Challenges to Politically Engaged Scholarship). Michigan State University Press: 15–49. doi:10.1353/nas.2007.0013.
- HDP Genel Komite (2014). "The Circassian Genocide". www.hdp.org.tr. Archived from the original on 16 March 2024.
- Hickel, Jason (2018). The Divide: A Brief Guide to Global Inequality and its Solutions. Windmill Books. ISBN 978-1786090034.
- Hill, Nat (13 October 2021). "An Gorta Mór: The Question of the Irish "Genocide"". Genocide Watch. Archived from the original on 11 February 2024.
- Hinton, Alexander (2010). "Savages, Subjects, and Sovereigns: Conjunctions of Modernity, Genocide, and Colonialism". In Moses, A. Dirk (ed.). Empire, Colony, Genocide: Conquest, Occupation, and Subaltern Resistance in World History. Berghahn Books. pp. 440–460. ISBN 9781845454524. JSTOR j.ctt9qd5qb.22.
- "'Nor Prayers for Mercy'". HistoryNet. 1 January 2017. Archived from the original on 20 June 2023.
- Hitchcock, Robert K.; Babchuk, Wayne A. (2011). "Genocide of Khoekhoe and San Peoples of Southern Africa". In Hitchcock, Robert K. (ed.). Genocide of Indigenous Peoples: A Critical Bibliographic Review. Routledge. doi:10.4324/9780203790830-7. ISBN 978-0203790830.
- Ho, Ping-ti (1959). Studies on the Population of China, 1368–1953. Cambridge: Harvard University Press.
- Hochschild, Adam (2006). King Leopold's Ghost: A Story of Greed, Terror, and Heroism in Colonial Africa. Pan Macmillan UK. ISBN 978-1-74329-160-3 – via Internet Archive.
- Hollander, Paul (1 July 2012). "Perspectives on Norman Naimark's Stalin's Genocides". Journal of Cold War Studies. 14 (3): 149–189. doi:10.1162/JCWS_a_00250. S2CID 57560838.
- Hovannisian, Richard G. (2002). "Confronting the Armenian Genocide". In Totten, Samuel; Jacobs, Steven Leonard (eds.). Pioneers of Genocide Studies. New Brunswick: Transaction Publishers. pp. 27–46. ISBN 978-1-4128-0957-3.
- Hubbard, Vincent (2002). A History of St. Kitts. Macmillan Caribbean. ISBN 9780333747605.
- Hughes, Robert (March 2020). "The Contemporary Cloak of Japanese Colonialism". Journal of Regional Development Studies. 23: 137–144.
- Hui, Victoria Tin-Bor (2023). "Genocide, Extermination and Mass Killing in Chinese History". In Kiernan, Ben; Lemos, Tracy Maria; Taylor, Tristan S. (eds.). The Cambridge World History of Genocide. Vol. I: Genocide in the Ancient, Medieval and Premodern Worlds. Cambridge University Press. pp. 376–399. doi:10.1017/9781108655989.017. ISBN 978-1-108-49353-6.
- Hull, Isabel V. (2005). Absolute Destruction: Military Culture and the Practices of War in Imperial Germany. NY: Cornell University Press. ISBN 978-0-8014-4258-2 – via Google Books.
- Hupchick, Dennis P. (2002). The Balkans: From Constantinople to Communism. Springer. ISBN 978-0-312-29913-2.
- Hyer, Paul (1977). The Chin-tan-tao Movement – A Chinese Revolt in Mongolia (1891). Altaica.
- Iliffe, John (1967). "The Organization of the Maji Maji Rebellion". The Journal of African History. 8 (3): 495–512. doi:10.1017/S0021853700007982. JSTOR 179833.
- Ittersum, Martine Julia van (2016). "Debating Natural Law in the Banda Islands: A Case Study in Anglo–Dutch Imperial Competition in the East Indies, 1609–1621". History of European Ideas. 42 (4): 459–501. doi:10.1080/01916599.2015.1101216.
- Jacobs, Steven Leonard (2023). "The Religion–Genocide Nexus". In Kiernan, Ben; Lemos, Tracy Maria; Taylor, Tristan S. (eds.). The Cambridge World History of Genocide. Vol. I: Genocide in the Ancient, Medieval and Premodern Worlds. Cambridge University Press. pp. 86–102. doi:10.1017/9781108655989.005. ISBN 978-1-108-49353-6.
- Javakhishvili, Niko (20 December 2012). "Coverage of The tragedy public Thought (later half of the 19th century)". Tbilisi State University. Archived from the original on 30 May 2023.
- Jennings, Francis (1990). Empire of Fortune: Crowns, Colonies, and Tribes in the Seven Years War in America. W. W. Norton & Company. ISBN 978-0-393-30640-8.
- Jonassohn, Kurt; Björnson, Karin Solveig (1998). Genocide and Gross Human Rights Violations: In Comparative Perspective. Piscataway, New Jersey: Transaction Publishers. ISBN 978-1-4128-2445-3.
- ——— (2006). Genocide: A Comprehensive Introduction. Routledge. ISBN 978-0-415-35385-4. Excerpts Chapter 1: Genocide in prehistory, antiquity, and early modernity Archived 10 October 2017 at the Wayback Machine
- ——— (2010). Genocide: A Comprehensive Introduction. Routledge. ISBN 978-1-136-93797-2.
- Jouanna, Arlette (2016) [2007]. The Saint Bartholomew's Day massacre: The mysteries of a crime of state. Translated by Bergin, Joseph. Manchester University Press. ISBN 9781526112187.
- Geçmişten günümüze Kafkasların trajedisi: uluslararası konferans, 21 Mayıs 2005 [The tragedy of the Caucasus from past to present: international conference, 21 May 2005] (in Turkish). Kafkas Vakfı Yayınları. 2006. ISBN 978-975-00909-0-5.
- Kakar, Mohammed Hassan (1995). Afghanistan: The Soviet Invasion and the Afghan Response, 1979–1982. University of California Press. ISBN 978-0-5209-1914-3 – via Google Books.
- Ke, Jing (Summer–Autumn 2012). "Change the Hostile Other into Ingroup Partner: On the Albanian-Serb Relations" (PDF). Kosovo Public Policy Center. 2 (2): 73–92. Archived from the original (PDF) on 20 January 2022.
- Kemasang, A. R. T. (1982). "The 1740 Massacre of Chinese in Java: Curtain Raiser for the Dutch Plantation Economy". Bulletin of Concerned Asian Scholars. 14. Cambridge: Committee of Concerned Asian Scholars: 61–71. doi:10.1080/14672715.1982.10412638. ISSN 0007-4810.
- Kennedy, Liam (2016). Unhappy the Land: The Most Oppressed People Ever, the Irish?. Dublin: Irish Academic Press. ISBN 978-1785370472.
- Kenny, Kevin (2003). New directions in Irish-American history. History of Ireland and the Irish diaspora (illustrated ed.). University of Wisconsin Press. ISBN 978-0-299-18714-9.
- Kent, Lauren (1 February 2019). "European colonizers killed so many Native Americans that it changed the global climate, researchers say". CNN. Archived from the original on 18 March 2025.
- Kévorkian, Raymond H. (2008). "The Cilician Massacres, April 1909". In Hovannisian, Richard G.; Payaslian, Simon (eds.). Armenian Cilicia. UCLA Armenian History and Culture Series: Historic Armenian Cities and Provinces. Costa Mesa, CA: Mazda Publishers. pp. 339–369.
- Kiang, Clyde (1992). The Hakka Odyssey & their Taiwan homeland. Allegheny Press. ISBN 978-0910042666.
- Kiernan, Ben (June 2002). "Cover-up and Denial of Genocide: Australia, the USA, East Timor, and the Aborigines". Critical Asian Studies. 34 (2): 163–192. doi:10.1080/14672710220146197. S2CID 146339164.
- ——— (2007). Blood and Soil: A World History of Genocide and Extermination from Sparta to Darfur. New Haven, CT: Yale University Press. ISBN 978-0-300-10098-3.
- Kinealy, Christine (1995). This Great Calamity: The Irish Famine 1845–52. Gill & Macmillan. p. 357. ISBN 978-1-57098-034-3.
- King, Michael (2000). Moriori: A People Rediscovered. Viking Books. ISBN 978-0-14-010391-5.
- King, Diane E. (2013). Kurdistan on the Global Stage: Kinship, Land, and Community in Iraq. Rutgers University Press. ISBN 978-0-8135-6354-1.
- King, Neysa (2009). "Rethinking and Recognizing Genocide: The British and the Case of the Great Irish Potato Famine". In Cooley, Dennis R.; Steffen, Lloyd (eds.). Re-Imaging Death and Dying. Inter-Disciplinary Press. pp. 123–132. ISBN 978-1-904710-82-0.
- Knowles, R. P.; Tomplins, J.; Worthen, W. B. (2003). Modern Drama: Defining the Field. University of Toronto Press. ISBN 978-0-8020-8621-1.
- Koch, Alexander; Brierley, Chris; Maslin, Mark M.; Lewis, Simon L. (2019). "Earth system impacts of the European arrival and Great Dying in the Americas after 1492". Quaternary Science Reviews. 207: 13–36. Bibcode:2019QSRv..207...13K. doi:10.1016/j.quascirev.2018.12.004.
- Koenigsburger, H. G.; Mosse, George; Bowler, G. Q. (1999). Europe in the sixteenth century (2nd ed.). Longman. ISBN 978-0582418639.
- Kopel, Dave; Gallant, Paul; Eisen, Joanne D. (11 April 2003). "A Moriori Lesson: a brief history of pacifism". National Review Online. Archived from the original on 11 April 2003.
- Kotar, S. L.; Gessler, J. E. (2013). Smallpox: A History. McFarland. ISBN 978-0786493272.
- Kullberg, Anssi (2004). "The Crimean Tatars". In Tanner, Arno (ed.). The Forgotten Minorities of Eastern Europe: The history and today of selected ethnic groups in five countries. East-West Books. ISBN 9789529168088.
- Kupperman, Karen O. (1993). Providence Island, 1630–1641: The Other Puritan Colony. Cambridge, MA: Harvard University Press.
- Lamessa, Feqadu (28 July 2013). "History 101: Fiction and Facts on Oromos of Ethiopia". Salem-News.com. Archived from the original on 22 June 2024.
- Lang, Berel (2005). "The Evil in Genocide". Genocide and Human Rights: A Philosophical Guide. Palgrave Macmillan UK. pp. 5–17. doi:10.1057/9780230554832_1. ISBN 978-0-230-55483-2.
- Langlois, Claude (1987). "Les héros quasi mythiques de la Vendée ou les dérives de l'imaginaire" [The quasi-mythical heroes of Vendée or the excesses of the imagination]. In Lebrun, F. (ed.). Histoire de France [History of France] (in French). pp. 426–434.
- ——— (June 1988). "Les dérives vendéennes de l'imaginaire révolutionnaire" [The Vendée excesses of the revolutionary imagination]. Annales. Histoire, Sciences Sociales (in French). 43 (3): 771–797. doi:10.3406/ahess.1988.283518. S2CID 163493045.
- Leitzinger, Antero (14 December 2004). "The Circassian Genocide". Global Politician. Archived from the original on 9 November 2013.
- Lenihan, Padraig (2001). Confederate Catholics at War. Cork: Cork University Press for the Irish Committee for Historical Sciences. ISBN 1-85918-244-5.
- Levene, Mark (2005). Genocide in the Age of the Nation State. Vol. 2: The Rise of the West and Coming Genocide. I. B. Tauris. ISBN 978-1-84511-057-4.
- ——— (2010). "Empires, Native Peoples, and Genocides". In Moses, A. Dirk (ed.). Empire, Colony, Genocide: Conquest, Occupation, and Subaltern Resistance in World History. Oxford and New York: Berghahn Books. pp. 183–204. ISBN 978-1-84545-452-4. JSTOR j.ctt9qd5qb.11.
- Levine, Donald N. (2000). Greater Ethiopia: The Evolution of a Multiethnic Society. University of Chicago Press. ISBN 978-0-226-47561-5.
- Lewallen, Ann-Elise (2016). The Fabric of Indigeneity: Ainu Identity, Gender, and Settler Colonialism in Japan. Albuquerque: University of New Mexico Press. ISBN 978-0-8263-5736-6.
- Lewy, Guenter (2007). "Were American Indians the Victims of Genocide?". History News Network. Archived from the original on 9 June 2024.
- Lindley, Robin (8 January 2017). "The Other Slavery: An Interview with Historian Andrés Reséndez". History News Network. Archived from the original on 20 June 2019.
- Lord, Lewis (August 1997). "Pre-Columbian Population: How Many People Were Here Before Columbus?" (PDF). U.S. News & World Report: The Bronx High School of Science.
- Loth, Vincent C. (1995). "Pioneers and Perkeniers: The Banda Islands in the 17th Century". Cakalele. 6. Honolulu: University of Hawaii at Manoa: 13–35. hdl:10125/4207.
- MacDonald, David B. (2 October 2015). "Canada's history wars: indigenous genocide and public memory in the United States, Australia and Canada". Journal of Genocide Research. 17 (4): 411–431. doi:10.1080/14623528.2015.1096583.
- MacDonald, David B.; Hudson, Graham (2012). "The Genocide Question and Indian Residential Schools in Canada". Canadian Journal of Political Science. 45 (2): 427–449. doi:10.1017/s000842391200039x.
- Macknight, C. C. (1986). "Macassans and the Aboriginal past". Archaeology in Oceania. 21: 69–75. doi:10.1002/j.1834-4453.1986.tb00126.x.
- Maddison, Angus (2007). Contours of the world economy 1–2030 AD: Essays in macro-economic history. Oxford University Press.
- Madley, Benjamin (2008). "From Terror to Genocide: Britain's Tasmanian Penal Colony and Australia's History Wars". Journal of British Studies. 47 (1): 77–106. doi:10.1086/522350. JSTOR 10.1086/522350. S2CID 146190611.
- ——— (2016). An American Genocide: The United States and the California Indian Catastrophe, 1846–1873. Yale University Press.
- ——— (2023). "'Too Furious': The Genocide of Connecticut's Pequot Indians, 1636–1640". In Kiernan, Ben; Lemos, T. M.; Taylor, Tristan S. (eds.). The Cambridge World History of Genocide. Vol. I: Genocide in the Ancient, Medieval and Premodern Worlds. Cambridge University Press. pp. 215–242. doi:10.1017/9781108655989. ISBN 978-1-108-65598-9.
- ——— (2023). "'A War of Extermination': The California Indian Genocide, 1846–1873". In Blackhawk, Ned; Kiernan, Ben; Madley, Benjamin; Taylor, Rebe (eds.). The Cambridge World History of Genocide. Vol. II: Genocide in the Indigenous, Early Modern and Imperial Worlds, from c.1535 to World War One. Cambridge University Press. pp. 412–433. doi:10.1017/9781108765480. ISBN 978-1-108-76548-0.
- Magocsi, Paul Robert (1996). A History of Ukraine. University of Toronto Press. ISBN 0-8020-7820-6.
- Mahoney, Michael R. (2023). "The Zulu Kingdom as a Genocidal and Post-genocidal Society, c.1810 to the Present". In Blackhawk, Ned; Kiernan, Ben; Madley, Benjamin; Taylor, Rebe (eds.). The Cambridge World History of Genocide. Vol. II: Genocide in the Indigenous, Early Modern and Imperial Worlds, from c.1535 to World War One. Cambridge University Press. pp. 335–357. doi:10.1017/9781108765480. ISBN 978-1-108-76548-0.
- Mann, Barbara Alice (2009). The Tainted Gift: The Disease Method of Frontier Expansion. ABC-CLIO.
- Manne, Robert (9 September 2006). "The cruelty of denial". The Age. Archived from the original on 7 May 2023.
- Manning, Patrick (1992). "The Slave Trade: The Formal Demographics of a Global System". In Inikori, Joseph E.; Engerman, Stanley L. (eds.). The Atlantic Slave Trade: Effects on Economies, Societies and Peoples in Africa, the Americas, and Europe. Duke University Press. ISBN 0-8223-8237-7.
- Mantran, Robert [in French] (1989). Histoire de l'Empire Ottoman [History of the Ottoman Empire] (in French). Fayard. ISBN 978-2-213-01956-7.
- Marcus, Harold G. (1994). A History of Ethiopia. University of California Press. ISBN 978-0-520-08121-5.
- Martin, Voir Jean-Clément (1987). La Vendée et la France [The Vendée and France] (in French). Le Seuil.
- Masters, Catherine (8 September 2007). "'Battle rage' fed Maori cannibalism". The New Zealand Herald. Archived from the original on 13 January 2024.
- Mayall, David (1995). English gypsies and state policies. New Saga Library. Vol. 7. University of Hertfordshire Press. ISBN 978-0-900458-64-4.
- McDonald, Jared (October 2016). "'We do not know who painted our pictures': child transfers and cultural genocide in the destruction of Cape San societies along the Cape Colony's north-eastern frontier, c.1770–1830". Journal of Genocide Research. 18 (4): 519–538. doi:10.1080/14623528.2016.1220581.
- Meade, Teresa A. (2016). History of modern Latin America: 1800 to the present. John Wiley & Sons.
- McBride, Preston (2023). "Lessons from Canada: The Question of Genocide in US Boarding Schools for Native Americans". In Blackhawk, Ned; Kiernan, Ben; Madley, Benjamin; Taylor, Rebe (eds.). The Cambridge World History of Genocide. Vol. II: Genocide in the Indigenous, Early Modern and Imperial Worlds, from c.1535 to World War One. Cambridge University Press. pp. 434–460. doi:10.1017/9781108765480. ISBN 978-1-108-76548-0.
- McCarthy, Justin (1996). "The land to be lost". Death and Exile: The Ethnic Cleansing of Ottoman Muslims, 1821–1922. Darwin Press Incorporated. ISBN 0-87850-094-4.
- ——— (2016). "1912–1913 Balkan Wars, Death and Forced Exile of Ottoman Muslims" (PDF). tc-america.org. Archived from the original (PDF) on 14 January 2024.
- McConnell, Michael N. (1997). A Country Between: The Upper Ohio Valley and Its Peoples, 1724–1774. University of Nebraska Press. ISBN 978-0-8032-8238-4.
- McD. Beckles, Hilary (2008). "Kalinago (Carib) Resistance to European Colonisation of the Caribbean". Caribbean Quarterly. 54 (4): 77–94. doi:10.1080/00086495.2008.11829737.
- Mcdonnell, Michael A.; Moses, A. Dirk (December 2005). "Raphael Lemkin as historian of genocide in the Americas". Journal of Genocide Research. 7 (4): 501–529. doi:10.1080/14623520500349951. S2CID 72663247.
- McGowan, Mark G. (2017). "The Famine Plot Revisited: A Reassessment of the Great Irish Famine as Genocide". Genocide Studies International. 11 (1). University of Toronto Press: 87–104. doi:10.3138/gsi.11.1.04.
- McNeill, J. R.; Pomeranz, Kenneth, eds. (2015). Production, Destruction and Connection, 1750–Present, Part 1, Structures, Spaces, and Boundary Making. The Cambridge World History. Vol. 7. Cambridge University Press. doi:10.1017/CBO9781139196079. ISBN 978-1-108-40775-5.
- McPhee, Peter (2023). "A Vicious Civil War in the French Revolution: 'The Vendée', 1793–1795". In Blackhawk, Ned; Kiernan, Ben; Madley, Benjamin; Taylor, Rebe (eds.). The Cambridge World History of Genocide. Vol. II: Genocide in the Indigenous, Early Modern and Imperial Worlds, from c.1535 to World War One. Cambridge University Press. pp. 312–334. doi:10.1017/9781108765480. ISBN 978-1-108-76548-0.
- Mcveigh, Robbie (2008). ""The balance of cruelty": Ireland, Britain and the logic of genocide". Journal of Genocide Research. 10 (4): 541–561. doi:10.1080/14623520802447792. S2CID 143655748.
- Michael, Franz H. (1966). The Taiping Rebellion: History and Documents. Vol. 1.
- Michno, Gregory (2003). Encyclopedia of Indian wars: western battles and skirmishes, 1850–1890. Mountain Press Publishing Company. ISBN 978-0-87842-468-9.
- Midlarsky, Manus I. (2005). The Killing Trap: genocide in the twentieth century. Cambridge University Press. ISBN 0-521-81545-2.
- Miller, Stuart Creighton (1982). Benevolent assimilation: the American conquest of the Philippines, 1899—1903. New Haven, Connecticut: Yale University Press. ISBN 0-300-03081-9. PBS documentary "Crucible of Empire".
- Mojzes, Paul (November 2013). "Ethnic Cleansing in the Balkans: Why Did It Happen and Could It Happen Again?" (PDF). Cicero Foundation Great Debate Paper. 13 (4). The Cicero Foundation. Archived from the original (PDF) on 12 June 2024.
- Monsutti, Alessandro (2003). "Hazāra II. History". Encyclopædia Iranica.
- Morel, Edmund D. (1905). King Leopold's Rule in Africa. New York: Funk & Wagnalls.
- Moses, Dirk A.; Stone, Dan (2013). Colonialism and Genocide. Routledge. ISBN 978-1-317-99753-5.
- Mullin, James V. (Spring–Summer 2002). "The New Jersey Famine Curriculum: a report". Eire-Ireland: Journal of Irish Studies. 37 (1–2): 119–129. doi:10.1353/eir.2002.0008. Archived from the original on 13 October 2007.
- Nakamura, Naohiro (2015). "Being Indigenous in a non-Indigenous environment: identity politics of the Dogai Ainu and new Indigenous policies of Japan". Environment and Planning A. 47 (3): 660–675. Bibcode:2015EnPlA..47..660N. doi:10.1068/a130003p.
- Nester, William R. (2000). "Haughty Conquerors": Amherst and the Great Indian Uprising of 1763. Greenwood Publishing Group. ISBN 978-0-275-96770-3.
- Neuburger, Mary (2004). The Orient Within: Muslim Minorities and the Negotiation of Nationhood in Modern Bulgaria. Cornell University Press. ISBN 9780801441325.
- Newson, Linda A. (2009). Conquest and Pestilence in the Early Spanish Philippines. University of Hawai'i Press. ISBN 978-0824861971.
- Nolen, Stephanie (21 April 2018). "'We are still here': The fight to be recognized as Indigenous in Uruguay". Globe and Mail. Archived from the original on 21 April 2024.
- Ó Gráda, Cormac (1995). The Great Irish famine. New Studies in Economic and Social History (illustrated, reprinted ed.). Cambridge University Press. ISBN 978-0-521-55787-0. Archived from the original on 13 August 2020.
- O'Leary, Brendam; McGarry, John (1995). "Regulating nations and ethnic communities". In Breton, Albert (ed.). Nationalism and Rationality. Cambridge University Press. ISBN 978-0-521-48098-7.
- Oltermann, Philip (28 May 2021). "Germany agrees to pay Namibia €1.1bn over historical Herero-Nama genocide". The Guardian. Archived from the original on 1 June 2021.
- Olusoga, David; Erichsen, Casper W. (2010). The Kaiser's Holocaust: Germany's Forgotten Genocide and the Colonial Roots of Nazism. London: Faber and Faber. ISBN 978-0571231416.
- Olusoga, David (18 April 2015). "Dear Pope Francis, Namibia was the 20th century's first genocide". The Guardian. Archived from the original on 18 November 2015.
- Orizio, Riccardo (2001). Lost White Tribes: The End of Privilege and the Last Colonials in Sri Lanka, Jamaica, Brazil, Haiti, Namibia, and Guadeloupe. Simon & Schuster. ISBN 978-0-7432-1197-0.
- Ørsted-Jensen, Robert (2011). Frontier History Revisited – Queensland and the 'History War'. Coorparoo, Brisbane, Qld: Lux Mundi Publishing. ISBN 9781466386822.
- Ó Gráda, Cormac (2000). Black '47 and Beyond: The Great Irish Famine in History, Economy, and Memory. Princeton University Press. ISBN 978-0-691-07015-5.
- Palmer, Alison (1998). "Colonial and modern genocide: explanations and categories". Ethnic and Racial Studies. 21: 89–115. doi:10.1080/014198798330115.
- Pankhurst, Richard (1997). The Ethiopian Borderlands: Essays in Regional History from Ancient Times to the End of the 18th Century. Red Sea Press. ISBN 978-0932415196.
- Parker, G., ed. (1998). Oxford Encyclopedia World History. Oxford: Oxford University Press. ISBN 0-19-860223-5.
- Pasachoff, Naomi E.; Littman, Robert J. (2005). A Concise History Of The Jewish People. Rowman & Littlefield. ISBN 0-7425-4366-8.
- Pavlakis, Dean (2023). "The Crime of the Congo: A Question of Genocide in the Congo Free State, 1885–1908". In Blackhawk, Ned; Kiernan, Ben; Madley, Benjamin; Taylor, Rebe (eds.). The Cambridge World History of Genocide. Vol. II: Genocide in the Indigenous, Early Modern and Imperial Worlds, from c.1535 to World War One. Cambridge University Press. pp. 585–608. doi:10.1017/9781108765480. ISBN 978-1-108-76548-0.
- "California Genocide". PBS. 2006. Archived from the original on 8 July 2007.
- Pekesen, Berna (2012). "Expulsion and Emigration of the Muslims from the Balkans". European History Online. Archived from the original on 12 June 2024.
- Pelissier, Roger (1967). The Awakening of China: 1793–1949. Translated by Kieffer, Martin. New York: Putnam.
- Penn, Nigel (June 2013). "The British and the 'Bushmen': the massacre of the Cape San, 1795 to 1828". Journal of Genocide Research. 15 (2): 183–200. doi:10.1080/14623528.2013.793081.
- Perdue, Peter C. (2005). China Marches West: The Qing Conquest of Central Eurasia. Cambridge, MA; London: The Belknap Press of Harvard University Press. ISBN 978-0-674-01684-2.
- Pérez, R. Michelle (9 December 2013). "Paco Ignacio Taibo II, documenta el brutal genocidio yaqui en nuestro país" [Paco Ignacio Taibo II, documents the brutal Yaqui genocide in our country] (in Spanish). Archived from the original on 27 April 2018.
- Perry, Michael (20 May 1997). "A Stolen Generation Cries Out". Reuters. Archived from the original on 10 December 2023.
- Petitfrère, Claude (1982). La Vendée et les Vendéens [The Vendée and the Vendéens] (in French). Editions Gallimard/Julliard.
- Popic, Linda (2008). "Compensating Canada's 'Stolen Generations'". Journal of Aboriginal History (December 2007–January 2008): 14.
- Powell, Christopher (2011). Barbaric Civilization: A Critical Sociology of Genocide. McGill-Queen's Press. ISBN 978-0773585560.
- Price, Roger (1993). A Concise History of France. Cambridge University Press.
- Pritzker, Barry (2000). A Native American Encyclopedia: History, Culture, and Peoples. Oxford University Press.
- Prucha, Francis Paul (1995). The Great Father: The United States Government and the American Indians. University of Nebraska Press. ISBN 978-0-8032-8734-1.
- Purcell, Victor (1962). China. London: Ernest Benn.
- Ramenofsky, Ann F. (1987). Vectors of Death: The Archaeology of European Contact. University of New Mexico Press.
- Reid, Anna (2000). Borderland: A Journey Through the History of Ukraine. Westview Press. ISBN 0-8133-3792-5.
- Reilly, Thomas H. (2011). The Taiping Heavenly Kingdom: Rebellion and the Blasphemy of Empire. University of Washington Press. ISBN 978-0-295-80192-6.
- Reiss, Oscar (2004). The Jews in Colonial America. McFarland & Company. ISBN 0-7864-1730-7.
- Reséndez, Andrés (2016). The Other Slavery: The Uncovered Story of Indian Enslavement in America. Houghton Mifflin Harcourt. ISBN 978-0-547-64098-3.
- Restoule, Jean-Paul (2002). "Seeing Ourselves. John Macionis and Nijole v. Benokraitis and Bruce Ravelli". Aboriginal Identity: The Need for Historical and Contextual Perspectives. Vol. 24. Toronto: Prentice Hall. pp. 102–112.
- "145th Anniversary of the Circassian Genocide and the Sochi Olympics Issue". Reuters. 22 May 2009.
- "Mexico president wants no beef with Spain, hints at other apology requests". Reuters. 26 March 2019. Archived from the original on 2 May 2019.
- Reynolds, Henry (2004). "Genocide in Tasmania". In Moses, A. Dirk (ed.). Genocide and Settler Society: Frontier Violence and Stolen Indigenous Children in Australian History. Berghahn Books. ISBN 978-1-57181-410-4.
- Rheault, D'Arcy (2011). "Solving the "Indian Problem": Assimilation Laws, Practices & Indian Residential Schools" (PDF). Ontario Métis Family Records Centre. Archived (PDF) from the original on 11 June 2012.
- Rifati, Fitim (2021). "Kryengritjet shqiptare në Kosovë si alternativë çlirimi nga sundimi serbo-malazez (1913-1914)" [Albanian uprisings in Kosovo as an alternative to liberation from Serbian-Montenegro rule (1913-1914)] (PDF). Journal of Balkan Studies (in Albanian). 1: 67–91. doi:10.51331/A004. Archived from the original (PDF) on 16 June 2023.
- Richmond, Walter (2008). The Northwest Caucasus: Past, Present, Future. London: Routledge. ISBN 978-1-134-00249-8.
- ——— (2013). The Circassian Genocide. Rutgers University Press. ISBN 978-0-8135-6069-4.
- Ritschel, Dan (1996), The Irish Famine: Interpretive & Historiographical Issues, Department of History, University of Maryland, archived from the original on 21 February 2009
- Robertson, R. G. (2001). Rotting Face: Smallpox and the American Indian. Caxton Press.
- Robins, Nicholas A. (2002). Genocide and Millennialism in Upper Peru: The Great Rebellion of 1780–1782. Greenwood Publishing Group. ISBN 978-0-275-97569-2.
- ——— (19 August 2006). "Genocide and the Great Rebellion of 1780–1782 in Peru and Upper Peru". Journal of Genocide Research. 7 (3): 351–375. doi:10.1080/14623520500190322. S2CID 72699791.
- Robins, Nicholas; Jones, Adam, eds. (2009). Genocides by the Oppressed. Indiana University Press. ISBN 978-0-253-22077-6.
- Rock, David (2002). State Building and Political Movements in Argentina, 1860–1916. Stanford University Press. ISBN 978-0-8047-4466-9.
- Roellinghoff, Michael (2020). "Osteo-hermeneutics: Ainu racialization, de-indigenization, and bone theft in Japanese Hokkaido". Settler Colonial Studies. 10 (3): 295–310. doi:10.1080/2201473X.2020.1760432.
- Rogers, Joel Augustus (2010). World's Great Men of Color. Vol. II. Simon & Schuster. ISBN 978-1-4516-0307-1.
- Rolf, Malte (2021). Imperial Russian Rule in the Kingdom of Poland, 1864–1915. University of Pittsburgh Press. ISBN 978-0822947011.
- Rosenthal, Herman (1906). "Cossacks' Uprising". The Jewish Encyclopedia. Archived from the original on 21 April 2024.
- Ross, David (2002). Ireland: History of a Nation. New Lanark: Geddes & Grosset. ISBN 978-1-84205-164-1.
- Rosser-Owen, Sarah A. S. Isla (1 October 2007). 'The First Circassian Exodus' to the Ottoman Empire (1858–1867), and the Ottoman Response, Based on the Accounts of Contemporary British Observers (PDF) (MA Near and Middle Eastern Studies). SOAS University of London.
- Rotker, Susana (2002). Captive Women: Oblivion And Memory In Argentina. University of Minnesota Press. ISBN 978-0816640300.
- Royal, Robert (1992). 1492 and all that: political manipulations of history. Ethics and Public Policy Center. ISBN 978-0-89633-174-7.
- Rubenstein, Hymie (8 November 2017). "The Myth of Indigenous Utopia". C2C Journal.
- Rubinstein, W. D. (2004). "Genocide and Historical Debate: William D. Rubinstein Ascribes the Bitterness of Historians' Arguments to the Lack of an Agreed Definition and to Political Agendas". History Today. 54. Archived from the original on 5 February 2009 – via Questia.
- Rugira, Lonzen (20 April 2022). "Why Genocide is "the crime of crimes"". Pan African Review. Archived from the original on 13 June 2024.
- Ruiz, Esther Brito (2024). "Assimilation and Dispossession: Cultural Genocide of the Ainu". In Bachman, Jeffrey S.; Ruiz, Esther Brito (eds.). A Modern History of Forgotten Genocides and Mass Atrocities. Routledge. pp. 29–53. doi:10.4324/9781003365754-3. ISBN 978-1003365754.
- Sanchez, Alexandra (2020). The Yaqui and Porfirio Díaz: Explaining One of the Largest Forgotten Genocides of Modern Mexico (Honors). University of Texas at Arlington. Archived from the original on 22 March 2025.
- Sarkin-Hughes, Jeremy (2008). Colonial Genocide and Reparations Claims in the 21st Century: The Socio-Legal Context of Claims under International Law by the Herero against Germany for Genocide in Namibia, 1904–1908. ABC-CLIO. ISBN 978-0-313-36257-6.
- Sauer, Elizabeth (23 June 2014). Milton, Toleration, and Nationhood. Cambridge University Press. ISBN 9781107041943.
- Schabas, William A. (2000). Genocide in International Law: The Crimes of Crimes (PDF) (1st ed.). Cambridge University Press. ISBN 0-521-78262-7. Archived from the original (PDF) on 16 June 2024.
- Schabas, William A. (2009). Genocide in International Law: The Crime of Crimes (2nd ed.). Cambridge: Cambridge University Press. ISBN 978-0-521-71900-1.
- Schaller, Dominik J. (2005). "Raphael Lemkin's view of European colonial rule in Africa: between condemnation and admiration". Journal of Genocide Research. 7 (4): 531–538. doi:10.1080/14623520500349977.
- ——— (2010). "From Conquest to Genocide: Colonial Rule in German Southwest Africa and German East Africa". In Moses, A. Dirk (ed.). Empire, Colony, Genocide: Conquest, Occupation, and Subaltern Resistance in World History. War and Genocide. Vol. 12 (1st ed.). New York City: Berghahn Books. pp. 296–324. ISBN 978-1-84545-452-4. JSTOR j.ctt9qd5qb.16.
- Schaller, Dominik J. (2011). ""Every Herero Will Be Shot"': Genocide, Concentration Camps, and Slave Labor in German South-West Africa". In Lemarchand, René (ed.). Forgotten Genocides: Oblivion, Denial, and Memory. University of Pennsylvania Press. pp. 51–70. ISBN 978-0-8122-4335-2.
- Schaller, Dominik J.; Zimmerer, Jürgen (2009). Late Ottoman genocides: the dissolution of the Ottoman Empire and Young Turkish population and extermination policies. London: Routledge. ISBN 978-0415480123. OCLC 263294453.
- Scharfstein, Sol (2004). Jewish History and You. KTAV Publishing House. ISBN 0-88125-806-7.
- Schertow, John Ani (18 June 2015). "Yaquis: the story of a people's war and a genocide in Mexico". Nationalia.
- Secher, Reynald (2003). A French Genocide: The Vendée. University of Notre Dame Press. ISBN 0-268-02865-6.
- Setiono, Benny G. (2008). Tionghoa dalam Pusaran Politik [Indonesia's Chinese Community under Political Turmoil] (in Indonesian). Jakarta: TransMedia Pustaka. ISBN 978-979-96887-4-3.
- Shannon, Jennifer (1 September 2014). "The Professionalization of Indigeneity in the Carib Territory of Dominica". American Indian Culture and Research Journal. 38 (4): 29–56. doi:10.17953/aicr.38.4.680p1633v5545v2t.
- Sharp, Andy (1 March 2009). "Tokyo's thriving Ainu community keeps traditional culture alive". Japan Today.
- Shenfield, Stephen (1999). "The Circassians: A Forgotten Genocide?". In Levene, Mark; Roberts, Penny (eds.). The Massacre in History. Oxford: Oxford University Press. pp. 149–162.
- Shirinian, George N. (2017). Genocide in the Ottoman Empire : Armenians, Assyrians, and Greeks, 1913–1923 (First ed.). New York: Berghahn Books. ISBN 978-1785334337. OCLC 957139268.
- "Khmel'nitskiy Bogdan" Хмельницкий Богдан [Khmelnitsky Bogdan]. The Shorter Jewish Encyclopedia (in Russian). 2005. Archived from the original on 6 March 2022.
- Siochrú, Micheál Ó (2023). "Extirpation and Annihilation in Cromwellian Ireland". In Kiernan, Ben; Blackhawk, Ned; Madley, Benjamin; Taylor, Rebe (eds.). The Cambridge World History of Genocide. Vol. II: Genocide in the Indigenous, Early Modern and Imperial Worlds, from c.1535 to World War One. Cambridge University Press. pp. 163–185. doi:10.1017/9781108765480. ISBN 978-1-108-48643-9.
- Sofuoglu, Murat (10 January 2018). "The Circassian exile: 9 facts about the tragedy". TRT World. Archived from the original on 22 April 2024.
- Solomon, Māui; Davis, Denise (2011). "Moriori". Te Ara: The Encyclopedia of New Zealand.
- Smith, Roger W. (11 March 2015). "Introduction: The Ottoman Genocides of Armenians, Assyrians, and Greeks". Genocide Studies International. 9 (1): 1–9. doi:10.3138/gsi.9.1.01. ISSN 2291-1847. S2CID 154145301.
- Spector, Robert Melvin (2005). World Without Civilization: Mass Murder and the Holocaust, History, and Analysis. University Press of America. ISBN 0-7618-2963-6.
- Spence, Jonathan D. (1996). God's Chinese Son: The Taiping Heavenly Kingdom of Hong Xiuquan. New York: W. W. Norton. ISBN 0-393-03844-0.
- Stampfer, Shaul (2003). "What Actually Happened to the Jews of Ukraine in 1648?". Jewish History. 17 (2): 165–178. doi:10.1023/A:1022330717763.
- Stannard, David E. (1993). American Holocaust: The Conquest of the New World. Oxford University Press. ISBN 978-0-19-508557-0.
- Staub, Ervin (1989). The Roots of Evil: The Origins of Genocide and Other Group Violence. Cambridge, UK: Cambridge University Press. ISBN 978-0-521-42214-7.
- Stearn, Esther Wagner; Stearn, Allen Edwin (1945). The Effect of Smallpox on the Destiny of the Amerindian. University of Minnesota.
- Steinvorth, Daniel (22 December 2016). "Jagd auf den Engel Pfau" [Hunting the Angel Peacock]. Neue Zürcher Zeitung (in Swiss High German). ISSN 0376-6829.
- Stern, Steve J., ed. (1987). Resistance, rebellion, and consciousness in the Andean peasant world, 18th to 20th centuries. Madison, Wis.: University of Wisconsin Press. ISBN 0299113507. OCLC 16227401.
- Straus, Scott (2022). Graziosi, Andrea; Sysyn, Frank E. (eds.). Genocide: The Power and Problems of a Concept. McGill-Queen's University Press. ISBN 978-0-2280-0951-1.
- Straver, Hans (2018). Vaders en dochters: Molukse historie in de Nederlandse literatuur van de negentiende eeuw en haar weerklank in Indonesië [Fathers and Daughters: Moluccan History in Nineteenth-Century Dutch Literature and Its Resonance in Indonesia] (in Dutch). Hilversum: Uitgeverij Verloren. ISBN 9789087047023.
- Subtelny, Orest (1994). Ukraine: A History. University of Toronto Press. ISBN 0-8020-0591-8.
- Sutherland, J. J. (27 October 2010). "L. Frank Baum Advocated Extermination of Native Americans". National Public Radio. Archived from the original on 19 May 2020.
- Tackett, Timothy (Autumn 2001). "Voir l'intervention". French Historical Studies.
- Tallonneau, Paul (1993). Les Lucs et le génocide vendéen: comment on a manipulé les textes [The Lukes and the Vendée genocide: how the texts were manipulated] (in French). Editions Hécate. ISBN 978-2-86913-051-7.
- Tanilli, Server (1987). Yüzyılların gerçeği ve mirası: insanlık tarihine giriş [Truth and legacy of the centuries: an introduction to human history] (in Turkish). Say. ISBN 9789754680010.
- Tasker, John Paul (29 May 2015). "Residential schools findings point to 'cultural genocide,' commission chair says". CBC. Archived from the original on 18 May 2016.
- Tatum, Dale C. (2010). Genocide at the Dawn of the Twenty-First Century: Rwanda, Bosnia, Kosovo, and Darfur. Palgrave Macmillan. ISBN 978-0-230-62189-3.
- Tatz, Colin Martin (2003). With Intent to Destroy: Reflections on Genocide. Verso Books. ISBN 1-85984-550-9.
- ——— (2006). "Confronting Australian Genocide". In Maaka, Roger; Andersen, Chris (eds.). The Indigenous Experience: Global Perspectives. Vol. 25. Canadian Scholars Press. pp. 16–36. ISBN 978-1551303000. PMID 19514155.
- Taylor, Becky (2014). Another Darkness Another Dawn. London: Reaktion Books Ltd. ISBN 978-1-78023-257-7.
- Thielen-Wilson, Leslie (2014). "Troubling the Path to Decolonization: Indian Residential School Case Law, Genocide, and Settler Illegitimacy". Canadian Journal of Law and Society. 29 (2): 181–197. doi:10.1017/cls.2014.4.
- Thomas, Roy (1989). Japan: The Blighted Blossom. I. B. Tauris. ISBN 978-1-85043-125-1.
- Thornton, Russell (1987). American Indian Holocaust and Survival: A Population History Since 1492. University of Oklahoma Press.
- Tokutomi, Masato (March 2024). "Ainu to setorā koroniarizumu: Indian-shi to Ainu-shi no hikaku" アイヌとセトラー・コロニアリズム : インディアン史とアイヌ史の比較 [Ainu and Settler Colonialism: Comparing Native American and Ainu History]. アイヌ・先住民研究 アイヌ・先住民研究 [Ainu and Indigenous Studies] (in Japanese). 4: 161–179. doi:10.14943/Jais.4.161. hdl:2115/91285.
- Totten, Samuel (2004). Teaching About Genocide: Issues, Approaches, and Resources. Information Age Publishing. ISBN 978-1-59311-075-8.
- Towner, Emil B. (2011). "Quantifying Genocide: What Are We Really Counting (On)?". JAC. 31 (3/4): 625–638. ISSN 2162-5190. JSTOR 41709663.
- Treuer, David (13 May 2016). "The new book 'The Other Slavery' will make you rethink American history". Los Angeles Times. Archived from the original on 20 June 2019.
- Tully, John (2011). The Devil's Milk A Social History of Rubber. Monthly Review Press. ISBN 978-1-58367-261-7.
- Turnbull, Clive (2003). Black War: The Extermination of the Tasmanian Aborigines. Lansdowne.
- United States Census Bureau (1994). Report on Indians taxed and Indians not taxed in the United States (except Alaska). Norman Ross Publishing. ISBN 978-0-88354-462-4.
- United States Congress (1865). Report of the Joint Committee on the Conduct of the War (PDF) (Report). Government Printing Office. Archived from the original (PDF) on 27 September 2024.
- United States Department of State (1913). Slavery in Peru: Message from the President of the United States Transmitting Report of the Secretary of State, with Accompanying Papers, Concerning the Alleged Existence of Slavery in Peru. U.S. Government Printing Office.
- United States Department of State (1943). Papers Relating to the Foreign Relations of the United States. U.S. Government Printing Office.
- Uriarte, Javier; Martínez-Pinzón, Felipe, eds. (2019). Intimate Frontiers A Literary Geography of the Amazon. Liverpool University Press. ISBN 9781786949721.
- Usher, Phillip (2014). "From Marriage to Massacre: The Louvre in August 1572". L'Esprit Créateur. 54 (2): 33–44. doi:10.1353/esp.2014.0023. JSTOR 26378894. S2CID 162224757.
- Valcárcel, Carlos (2004) [1915]. El proceso del Putumayo y sus secretos inauditos [The Putumayo process and its unprecedented secrets] (in Spanish). Centro de Estudios Teológicos de la Amazonía. ISBN 978-9972-9410-9-2.
- Valencia-Weber, Gloria (January 2003). "The Supreme Court's Indian Law Decisions: Deviations from Constitutional Principles and the Crafting of Judicial Smallpox Blankets". University of Pennsylvania Journal of Constitutional Law. 5: 405–482. Archived from the original on 7 October 2014.
- Vanthemsche, Guy (2012). Belgium and the Congo, 1885–1980. Cambridge; New York: Cambridge University Press. ISBN 978-0521194211.
- Vovelle, Michel (1988). "L'Historiographie de la Revolution française a la veille du Bicentenaire" [The Historiography of the French Revolution on the Eve of the Bicentenary]. Annales Historiques de la Revolution franfaise (in French). 272.
- "Residential School History: A Legacy of Shame" (PDF). Wabano Centre for Aboriginal Health. 2000. Archived from the original (PDF) on 3 December 2015.
- Walsh, John (April 2004). ""To Hell or to Connaught" Oliver Cromwell's Settlement of Ireland". Irish Cultural Society. Archived from the original on 11 October 2007.
- Walter, Eugene Victor (1969). Terror and Resistance: A Study of Political Violence, with Case Studies of Some Primitive African Communities. Oxford University Press.
- Washburn, Kevin K. (February 2006). "American Indians, Crime, and the Law". Michigan Law Review. 104 (4): 709–777. JSTOR 40041462.
- Waxman, Meyer (2003). History of Jewish Literature Part 3. Kessinger Publishing. ISBN 0-7661-4370-8.
- Weisbord, Robert G. (2003). "The King, the Cardinal and the Pope: Leopold II's genocide in the Congo and the Vatican". Journal of Genocide Research. 5: 35–45. doi:10.1080/14623520305651. S2CID 73371517.
- Weiss, Mosheh (2004). A Brief History of the Jewish People. Rowman & Littlefield. ISBN 0-7425-4402-8.
- Weiss-Wendt, Anton (December 2005). "Hostage of Politics: Raphael Lemkin on 'Soviet Genocide'". Journal of Genocide Research. 7 (4). Routledge: 551–559. doi:10.1080/14623520500350017. ISSN 1462-3528. S2CID 144612446.
- Wertham, Fredric (1968). A Sign For Cain: An Exploration of Human Violence. ISBN 978-0-7091-0232-8 – via Internet Archive.
- White, Matthew (2011). Atrocities: The 100 Deadliest Episodes in Human History. W. W. Norton. ISBN 978-0-393-08192-3.
- Winthrop, John (1996). Dunn, Richard S.; Savage, James; Yeandle, Laetitia (eds.). Journal of John Winthrop. Cambridge, MA: Harvard University Press.
- Woodham-Smith, Cecil (1964). "The Great Hunger: Ireland 1845–1849". Signet: New York: 19.
- Woolford, Andrew (2009). "Ontological Destruction: Genocide and Canadian Aboriginal Peoples". Genocide Studies and Prevention. 4 (1): 81–97. doi:10.3138/gsp.4.1.81.
- Wortman, Richard (2000). Scenarios of Power: From Alexander II to the abdication of Nicholas II. Princeton University Press. ISBN 0691029474.
- Yampolski, Vladimir (8 December 2004). Трагедия Айнов – Трагедия Российского дальнего востока [The tragedy of the Ainu – The tragedy of the Russian Far East] (in Russian). kamtime.ru. Archived from the original on 27 September 2018.
