= Braun =

Surname list

Braun is a German surname, originating from the German word for the color brown.

In German, Braun is pronounced [bʁaʊn] – except for the "r", equal to the English word "brown". In English, it is often pronounced like "brawn".

Notable people with the name include:

== Given name ==
- Braun Strowman (formerly Braun Stowman), ring name of American professional wrestler Adam Scherr (born 1983)

== Surname ==
- Adi Braun (born 1962), Canadian singer
- Adolphe Braun (1812–1877), French photographer
- Ákos Braun (born 1978), Hungarian judoka
- Albert Braun (1889–1983), American Roman Catholic priest
- Alexander Braun (1805–1877), German botanist
- Alexandra Braun (born 1983), Venezuelan actress
- Alexandra Braun (legal scholar), Italian legal scholar
- Alfred Braun (1888–1978), German screenwriter
- Amanda Braun, American athletic director
- André Braun (born 1944), Luxembourgish archer
- Anna Maria Braun (born 1979), German business executive and lawyer
- Annette Frances Braun (1884–1978), American entomologist
- Anton Braun (born 1990), German rower
- Arik Braun (born 1988), German chess grandmaster
- Arthur Michael Braun (1910–1989), American politician and businessman
- August Emil Braun (1809–1856), German archaeologist
- Augustus Braun Kinzel (1900–1987), American metallurgist
- Aurel Braun (born 1974), Canadian political scientist
- Axel Braun (born 1966), Italian-American film producer
- Ben Braun (born 1953), American college basketball coach
- Bill Braun, American NASCAR driver
- Bob Braun (1929–2001), Cincinnati television personality
- Boris Braun (1920–2018), Croatian agronomist
- Carl Braun (disambiguation), several people
- Carlos Rodríguez Braun (born 1948), Argentine economist
- Carol Braun Pasternack (1950–2020), American historian
- Carol Moseley Braun (born 1947), African-American politician and lawyer
- Carola von Braun (1942–2026), German politician
- Christian Braun (born 2001), American basketball player
- Christopher Braun (born 1991), German-Ghanaian footballer
- Clemens Braun (1862–1933), German composer
- Colin Braun (born 1988), American race car driver
- Coloman Braun-Bogdan (1905–1983), Romanian football manager
- Constantin Braun (born 1988), German ice hockey defenceman
- Craig Braun (born 1939), American actor
- Creighton Braun (born 2001), American soccer player
- Curt Johannes Braun (1903–1961), German screenwriter
- Dagmar Braun Celeste (born 1942), American non-fiction writer
- Dan Braun (born 1962), American musician
- Daniel Braun (born 1992), German computer scientist and author
- David Braun (born 1979), Ukrainian politician
- Dieter Braun (born 1943), German motorcycle racer
- Edgar Braun (born 1939), German real estate broker
- Editta Braun (born 1958), Austrian choreographer
- Eduardo Braun-Menéndez (1903–1959), Argentine physiologist
- Egidius Braun (1925–2022), president of the German Soccer Association (1992–2001)
- Ekkehard Braun, German rower
- Émile Braun (1849–1927), Belgian liberal politician, Mayor of Ghent
- Emily Braun (born 1957), Canadian art historian
- Emma Lucy Braun (1889–1971), American botanist and ecologist
- Emmy Braun (1826–1904), German cookbook author
- Erna Braun, Canadian politician
- Ernest Braun (1925–2015), British-Austrian technology assessor
- Eva Braun (1912–1945), longtime companion of Adolf Hitler
- Ewa Braun (born 1944), Polish graphic designer
- Felipe Braun (born 1970), Chilean actor
- Felix Braun (1885–1973), Austrian writer
- Florian Braun (born 1989), German politician
- François Braun (born 1962), French politician
- Frank Braun, Brazilian-American journalist
- Franziska Braun (1885–1976), mother of Eva Braun
- Freddie Braun (born 1988), American soccer player
- Friedrich Braun (1862–1942), Russian-German philologist
- Friedrich Wilhelm Braun (1941–2025), Brazilian basketball player
- Gaston Braun (1903–1990), Belgian bobsledder
- Georg Braun (1541–1622), German geographer
- Georg Braun (footballer) (1907–1963), Austrian footballer
- Georg Braun (motorcyclist) (1918–1995), German motorcyclist
- Gerhard Braun (1923–2015), German politician
- Gordon Braun (born 1977), Luxembourgish footballer
- Greg Braun, Australian tennis player
- Gregor Braun (born 1955), German bicycle racer
- Gretl Braun (1915–1987), Eva Braun's sister
- Grzegorz Braun (born 1967), Polish journalist, media director and politician
- György Bálint (originally surname Braun; 1919–2020), Hungarian horticulturist, Candidate of Agricultural Sciences, journalist, author, and politician
- Győző Braun (1911–1972), Hungarian and British table tennis champion, better known as Viktor Barna
- Hans Braun (disambiguation), several people
- Harald Braun (director) (1901–1960), German film director
- Harald Braun (diplomat) (born 1952), German diplomat
- Harald E. Braun, German historian
- Harland Braun (born 1942), American criminal defense lawyer
- Harry Braun (born 1948), American politician
- Heinrich Braun (1862–1934), German surgeon
- Heinrich Braun (writer) (1854–1927), German writer
- Heinz Braun (1938–1986), German painter
- Hel Braun (1914–1986), German mathematician
- Helena Braun (1903–1990), German soprano
- Helge Braun (born 1972), German politician
- Henrique Braun (born 1968), American-Brazilian Coca-Cola CEO
- Henry Braun (1930–2014), American poet
- Henry Braun (politician) (born 1950), Canadian politician
- Herman Braun-Vega (1933–2019), Peruvian painter
- Hermann Braun (1917–1945), German film actor
- Howie Braun (1912–1995), American basketball coach
- Hubert Braun (1939–2012), German bobsledder
- Ilse Braun (1909–1979), German assistant
- Isabella Braun (1815–1886), German writer
- Jaime Caetano Braun (1924–1999), Brazilian folk musician, composer and poet
- Jake Braun (born 1975), American politician
- Jan Guenther Braun, Canadian writer
- Janet Braun-Reinitz, American muralist and painter
- Jeff Braun, American video game developer
- Jeff Braun (mix engineer) (born 1989), American mix engineer
- Jennifer Braun (born 1991), German singer
- Jerzy Braun (disambiguation), several people
- Jim Braun, American football coach
- Johanna Braun (1929–2008), German writer
- Johannes Braun (1919–2004), German Roman Catholic bishop
- John Braun (born 1967), American politician
- John Braun (baseball) (1939–2011), American baseball pitcher
- Jonathan Braun, American oncologist
- Josh Braun (born 1961), American musician and composer
- Joshua Braun (born 1994), American professional basketball player
- Josias Braun-Blanquet (1884–1980), Swiss botanist
- Josy Braun (1938–2012), Luxembourgish writer
- József Braun (1901–1943), Hungarian footballer
- Julie Braun-Vogelstein (1883–1971), German-American art historian
- Julius Braun (1825–1869), German historian
- Jürgen Braun (born 1961), German politician
- Justin Braun (disambiguation), several people
- Karl Braun (disambiguation), several people
- Kaspar Braun (1807–1877), German wood engraver
- Käthe Braun (1913–1994), German film actress
- Kazimierz Braun (born 1936), Polish director
- Kevin Braun, American politician
- Kira Braun (born 1995), German politician
- Lasse Braun (born Alberto Ferrero, 1936–2015), Franco-Italian director
- Lauren Braun Costello (born 1976), American chef
- Laurin Braun (born 1991), German ice hockey player
- Lena Braun (born 1961), German artist
- Lilian Jackson Braun (1913–2011), American writer
- Lily Braun (1865–1916), German feminist writer
- Lioba Braun (born 1957), German opera singer
- Lloyd Braun (born 1958), American executive
- Lois Braun (born 1949), Canadian writer
- Louis Braun (1836–1916), German painter
- Lucas Braun (born 2001), American baseball player
- Lucien Braun (1923–2020), French philosophy historian
- Luitpold Braun (born 1950), German politician
- Lundy Braun, American historian
- Ma Braun (1881–1956), Dutch swimming coach
- Madeleine Braun (1907–1980), French politician
- Maggie Hope Braun, Canadian activist
- Margaret Braun (born 1962), American baker
- Marie Braun (1911–1982), Dutch swimmer, daughter of Ma Braun
- Mr. B. (Mark Braun) (born 1957), American pianist
- Markus Braun (born 1969), Austrian chief executive
- Markus Braun (handballer) (born 1959), Swiss handball player
- Martin Braun (born 1968), German football manager
- Márton Braun (born 1963), Hungarian politician
- Marvin Braun (born 1982), German footballer
- Matt Braun (1932–2016), American writer of Western novels
- Matthias Braun (Czech: Matyáš Bernard Braun; 1684–1738), sculptor and carver
- Maurice Braun (1877–1941), American painter
- Max Braun (1883–1967), American competitor
- Maxim Braun (born 1993), Kazakhstani biathlete
- Maximilian Braun (1850–1930), German zoologist
- Meredith Braun (born 1973), New Zealand film actress
- Michael Braun (disambiguation), several people
- Michel Braun (1930–2021), Luxembourgish sports shooter
- Mirko Braun (1942–2004), Croatian association football player
- Netalie Braun (born 1978), Israeli poet
- Nicholas Braun (born 1988), American actor
- Nico Braun (born 1950), Luxembourgish former footballer
- Otto Braun (1872–1955), German Social Democratic politician and prime minister of Prussia
- Otto Braun (communist) (1900–1974), German communist and representative
- Otto Philipp Braun (1798–1869), German biographer
- Otto Philipp Braun (journalist) (1824–1900), German editor
- Peter Braun (disambiguation), several people
- Peter-Victor Braun (1825–1882), French Roman Catholic priest
- Pieter Braun (born 1993), Dutch Olympic athlete
- Pinkas Braun (1923–2008), Swiss film actor
- Placidus Braun (1756–1829), German historian and archivist
- Pyper Braun (born 2013), American child actress
- Ralf Braun (born 1973), German backstroke swimmer
- Ralph Braun (1940–2013), American businessman
- Ray Braun (born 1936), American football coach
- Raymond Braun, American journalist
- Renaida Braun (born 1997), Swedish-Tanzanian singer
- Reiner Braun (born 1952), German journalist
- Rick Braun (born 1955), American jazz trumpet player
- Robert D. Braun, American aerospace engineer
- Robin Braun (born 1958), American vice admiral
- Roland Braun (born 1972), German Nordic combined skier
- Rudolf Braun (composer) (1869–1925), Austrian pianist and composer
- Rudolf Braun (historian) (1930–2012), Swiss historian
- Rudolf Braun (politician) (born 1955), German politician
- Russell Braun (born 1965), Canadian operatic lyric baritone, son of Victor Braun
- Ryan Braun (born 1983), American MVP baseball player
- Ryan Braun (pitcher) (born 1980), Canadian baseball pitcher
- Sabine Braun (born 1965), German athlete
- Sandrino Braun-Schumacher (born 1988), German footballer
- Sanford Braun, better known as Sandy Koufax (born 1935), American Major League Baseball Hall of Fame pitcher
- Sara Braun (1862–1955), Latvian-Chilean businesswoman
- Scooter Braun (born 1981), American executive
- Scott Braun, American television sports announcer
- Sergej Braun (born 1989), German kickboxer
- Shony Alex Braun (1932–2002), Hungarian violinist
- Solomon Braun (1868–1899), French military personnel
- Sophia Braun (born 2000), Argentine-American footballer
- Stephen Braun (born 1957), American reporter
- Steve Braun (disambiguation), several people
- Suanne Braun (born 1968), South African actress
- Suzanne Braun Levine, American writer
- Sylwester Braun (1909–1996), Polish photographer
- Tamara Braun (born 1971), American actress
- Taylor Braun (born 1991), American professional basketball player
- Ted Braun, American film director
- Thomas Braun (1876–1961), Belgian lawyer and poet
- Tim Braun (disambiguation), several people
- Toyoko Braun Takami (born 1945), Japanese composer and music educator
- Ulrich Braun (1941–2023), German footballer
- Ursula Braun-Moser (1937–2022), German politician
- V. G. Braun-Dusemond (1919–1998), German painter
- Victor Braun (1935–2001), Canadian-born operatic baritone, father of Russell Braun
- Virginia Braun, New Zealand psychologist
- Volker Braun (born 1939), German writer
- Von Braun (disambiguation), several people
- Warren Braun (born 1934), American politician
- Werner Braun (musicologist) (1926–2012), German musicologist
- Werner Braun (photojournalist) (1918–2018), Israeli photographer
- Whitny Braun (born 1984), American bioethicist
- Wilhelm Braun (1897–1969), German cross-country skier
- Willi Braun (born 1944), German badminton player
- Wolfgang Braun (born 1944), German handball player
- Yaël Braun-Pivet (born 1970), French politician
- Yael Cohen Braun (born 1986), South African-Canadian philanthropist
- Yehezkel Braun (1922–2014), Israeli composer
- Yosef Yeshaya Braun, American rabbi
- Zev Braun (1928–2019), American film producer
- Zyon Braun (born 1994), German politician

== See also ==
- Braun (disambiguation)
- Brauneis
- Brawn (disambiguation)
- Brown (surname)
- Browne
- Brauner
- Bruff Bruno Brugh
