= Bruun =

Bruun is a surname of North Germanic origin. The meaning is brown (brun in Danish, Swedish and Norwegian). In Denmark, the name is known to have been in use since the 13th century in the form Bruun. Other spelling variants are Bruhn and Brun. Today, c. 0.1% of the population carries Bruun as their surname or middle name. The name is also in use in Norway (c. 0.02% of the population), the Faroe Islands and the other Nordic countries (even less frequent).

In the Danish translation of Peanuts, Charlie Brown is called Søren Brun.

== Abundance ==
As of 2007, the numbers of bearers of the surnames Bruun, Bruhn and Brun in the Nordic countries are:

	Bruun	Bruhn	Brun	source
Denmark	6382	1540	566	Statistics Denmark
Sweden	320	830	409	Statistics Sweden
Norway	1003	47	999	Statistics Norway
Finland	486	26	41	Finnish Population Register Centre

The infrequent occurrences of Bruun as a surname outside Scandinavia, mainly Germany, Great Britain, Canada and the U.S., is due to immigration from the Nordic countries; in Germany possibly as a variation over the given name Bruno.

== Notable people ==
=== Persons with Bruun as their surname ===
- Amalie Bruun (born 1985), Danish singer, musician, model
- Anders Bruun (born 1979), Swedish bandy player
- Anton Frederik Bruun (1901–1961), Danish oceanographer and ichthyologist
- Antti Bruun (1979 -), Finnish ice hockey player
- Bertel Bruun (1937–2011), Danish-American ornithologist and illustrator
- Birgitte Bruun (1934–1997), Danish actress
- Malte Conrad Bruun (1755–1826), Danish-French geographer and journalist
- Edgar Bruun (1905–1985), Norwegian race walker
- Erik Bruun (born 1926), Finnish designer
- Geoffrey Bruun (1899–1988), Canadian-American historian
- Hans Henrik Bruun (1939–2018), Danish-British engineer
- Hans Henrik R. Bruun (1946 -), Danish sociologist and diplomat
- Kai Aage Bruun (1899–1971), Danish composer and state radio administrator
- Kim Malthe-Bruun (1923–1945), Danish resistance fighter against the Nazi occupation
- Mads Pagh Bruun (1809–1884), Danish politician
- Magnus Bruun (1984-), Danish actor
- Morten Bruun (1965-), Danish football player
- Peter Daniel Bruun (1796–1864), Danish politician
- Scott Bruun (born 1966), American politician
- Charles Kristian Bonnycastle Bruun (1979–), Canadian-Finnish actor

=== Persons with Brun as their surname ===
- Ane Brun (born 1976), Norwegian singer-songwriter
- Charles Brun (1866–1919), Danish politician
- Constantin Brun (1746–1836), German-Danish merchant
- Eske Brun (1904–1987), Danish governor in Greenland during World War II
- Friederike Brun (1765–1835) German-Danish author and art patron, wife of Constantin Brun
- Johan Nordahl Brun (1745–1816), Norwegian poet and bishop
- Viggo Brun (1885–1978) - Norwegian mathematician

== See also ==
- Bruhn
