= Braun (disambiguation) =

Braun (German for "brown") may refer to:

- Braun, surname of German origin
- Braun Building, a historic building in Los Angeles, California
- Braun (company), a German electronics and appliance company
- B. Braun Melsungen, a German medical supplies and drugs company
- Braun's Fashions, the former name of clothing retailer Christopher & Banks
- Carl Braun Camera-Werk (new name Braun Photo Technik GmbH), German electronics, slide projector and camera maker
- Braun Racing, a NASCAR team
- C. F. Braun, an American engineering company, designed petroleum and chemical processing facilities; acquired by KBR
- BraunAbility, American manufacturer of wheelchair lifts and accessible vans, formerly known as The Braun Corporation

== See also ==
- Brawn (disambiguation)
- Brown (disambiguation)
- Braune
- Brauner
- Von Braun (disambiguation)
