= Brawny =

Brawny may refer to:

- Brawny, a barony in County Westmeath, Ireland
- Brawny, Ontario, Canada, an unincorporated place in Algonquin Provincial Park
- Brawny, a brand of paper towels owned by Georgia-Pacific
- Brawny, NATO reporting name of the Ilyushin Il-40 aircraft
- Brawny, one of the seven giants in the animated film A Snow White Christmas (1980)
- Mazda Bongo Brawny, a van

== See also ==
- Brawn (disambiguation)
