= Hagen Schulze =

German historian

- Born: 31 July 1943; Tangier, Spanish protectorate in Morocco
- Died: 4 September 2014 (aged 71)
- Occupation: Historian

Hagen Schulze (31 July 1943 – 4 September 2014) was a German historian who held a position at the Free University of Berlin. He specialized in early modern and modern German and European history, particularly in comparative European nationalisms.

== Life ==
Schulze, the son of orientalist and diplomat Peter Hans Schulze (* 1919), a member of the Sicherheitsdienst in WWII, and his wife Dr. phil. Sigrid Hunke, studied medieval and early modern history, philosophy and political science at the University of Bonn and the University of Kiel. In 1967 he earned his doctorate and worked during the following years at the Prussian Cultural Heritage Foundation in Berlin and for the Federal Archives in Koblenz. In 1977 he earned his habilitation with his biography of Reiner Braun, after which he worked as a private tutor and as a substitute teacher at Kiel and Berlin until 1979, when he was named a full professor of modern history and historiography at the Free University of Berlin.

During the Historikerstreit of 1986–7, Schulze did not defend the views of Ernst Nolte that Nazi war crimes, including The Holocaust, constituted a reaction to a perceived "Jewish declaration of war" against Germany, compounded by Nazi fears of Soviet communism. However, he did criticize Nolte's principal opponent, Jürgen Habermas, for presenting overly-simplistic views: on the one hand, liberals who supported the mainstream view of German history; on the other hand a group of historians promoted by conservatives.

From 2000 to 2006 Schulze was the director of the German Historical Institute in London.

== Selected works ==
- Kleine deutsche Geschichte (C. H. Beck, Munich, 1996)
- States, Nations and Nationalism: From the Middle Ages to the Present (The Making of Europe) (with William E. Yuill, 1998)
- Germany: A New History (with Deborah Lucas Schneider, 2001)
- The Course of German Nationalism: From Frederick the Great to Bismarck 1763-1867 (with Sarah Hanbury-Tenison, 2003)
