= Brauner =

Brauner is a surname. Notable people with the surname include:

== People ==
- Alfred Brauner (1910–2002), French-Austrian scholar, child psychologist and author
- Artur Brauner (1918–2019), also called Atze Brauner, German film producer and entrepreneur
- Asher Brauner (1946–2021), American actor
- Bohuslav Brauner (1855–1935), Czech chemist
- Françoise Brauner (1911–2000), French-Austrian pediatrician and child psychiatrist
- Harry Brauner (1908–1988), Romanian ethnomusicologist and composer
- Henry Brauner (born 1984), also called George Valencia, American-Filipino soccer player
- Jo Brauner (born 1937), German journalist
- Sibylle Brauner (born 1975), German alpine skier
- Victor Brauner (1903–1966), also called Viktor Brauner, Romanian painter

== Families ==
- Brauner family, Swedish noble family

== See also ==
- The Von Brauners, a professional wrestling tag team/stable consisting of several members with the character surname Von Brauner
- Braun
- Brawner
