= Brauneis =

Brauneis is a surname of German origin closely related to Braun and Bruhn, all indicating a dark complexion.

Notable people with this surname include:

- Daniel Brauneis (born 1986), Austrian footballer
- Jean-Chrysostome Brauneis I (1785–1832), Canadian composer, bandmaster, and music educator of German birth
- Jean-Chrysostome Brauneis II (1814–1871), Canadian composer, organist, and music educator
- Robert Brauneis, law professor whose research led to the removal of a copyright claim for the song Happy Birthday to You
