= Jean Jacques Nicolas Huot =

French geographer, geologist and naturalist

Jean Jacques Nicolas Huot (February 12, 1790, Paris – May 19, 1845, Versailles) was a French geographer, geologist and naturalist.

A member of several learned societies, he was a founding member of the Société géologique de France (1830). He authored various works on natural history (about fossils of animals and plants), geology and geography. He completed the "Précis de la géographie universelle" ("A system of universal geography") of Conrad Malte-Brun in 1829, which was left unfinished after the death of the Danish scholar in 1826. He also contributed the geological work "Nouveau cours élémentaire de géologie" to "Suites à Buffon", published by the library Roret. In addition, he made contributions to Nicolas Desmarest's "Encyclopédie méthodique : Géographie-physique". Late in his life, he was the curator of the library of the city of Versailles.
