= Malte =

Malte or Malthe is a male given name that is mainly used in Denmark, Sweden and Germany, which is from Old Danish Malti. It originated from Helmhold / Helmwald ("helmet-govern") or from former Low German and Old Danish short form of Old German names beginning with Mahal- "assembly". It described the advisor of the Thing (assembly).

It may refer to:

- Malte-Conrad Bruun (1755–1826), Danish-French geographer
- Malte Amundsen (born 1998), Danish footballer
- Malte Ebdrup (born 2006), Danish racing driver
- Malte Frejd (born 2006), Swedish footballer
- Malte Gallée (born 1993), German politician
- Malte Gårdinger (born 2000), Swedish actor
- Malte Kaufmann (born 1976), German economist, entrepreneur and politician
- Malte Ludin (born 1942), German filmmaker
- Malte Persson (born 1976), Swedish author
- Malte Tängmark Roos (born 1994), Swedish politician
- The Notebooks of Malte Laurids Brigge, novel by Rainer Maria Rilke

It is also the French name of Malta.

== Surname ==
- Ethelreda Malte, alleged illegitimate daughter of Henry VIII of England and the royal laundress.
- Kim Malthe-Bruun (1923-1945), Danish resistance member during World War II
- Natassia Malthe (born 1974), Norwegian model and actress
