= Conrad Malte-Brun =

Dano-French geographer and journalist

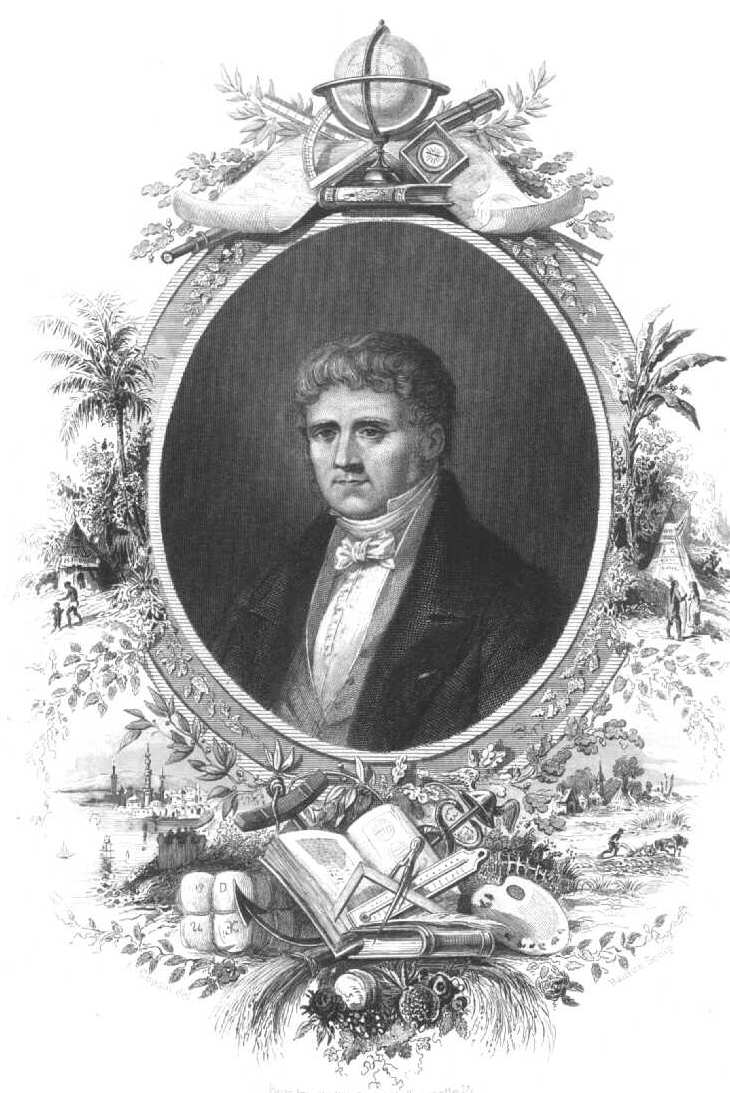
- Born: 12 August 1775; Thisted
- Died: 14 December 1826 (aged 51); Paris
- Known for: journalism coining the name for the geographic region Oceania

Academic background
- Education: University of Copenhagen

Academic work
- Discipline: geography
- Notable works: Géographie mathématique, physique et politique de toutes les parties du monde

Conrad Malte-Brun(French: [kɔ̃ʁad malt bʁœ̃]; born Malthe Conrad Bruun; 12 August 1775 – 14 December 1826), sometimes referred to simply as Malte-Brun, was a Dano-French geographer and journalist. His second son, Victor Adolphe Malte-Brun, was also a geographer. Today he is perhaps best remembered for coining the name for both the geographic regions of Oceania (French Océanie) around 1812 and Indo-China in 1804.

== Biography ==
Born in Thisted to an administrator of Danish crown lands, Malte-Brun was originally destined for a career as a pastor, but chose instead to attend classes at the University of Copenhagen, and became a supporter of the French Revolution and an activist in favor of freedom of the press. Following the harsh censorship laws instituted by the Danish ruler crown prince Frederick in September 1799, he was indicted because of his many pamphlets which contained outright criticism of the government, which the new censorship laws forbade. A particular cause for offence was a pamphlet he published in 1795 entitled "Catechism of the Aristocrats."

The case of Peter Andreas Heiberg, who for similar crimes had been sentenced to exile at Christmas of 1799, did not make Malte-Brun optimistic about his prospects. Poul Skibsted acted as prosecutor in both trials. Bruun had already left the country prior to the court sentence (which was first carried late 1800) and had settled first in Sweden, later in the Free City of Hamburg.

At some point during his exile, he started using his Danish first name, Malthe, as part of his surname, Bruun.

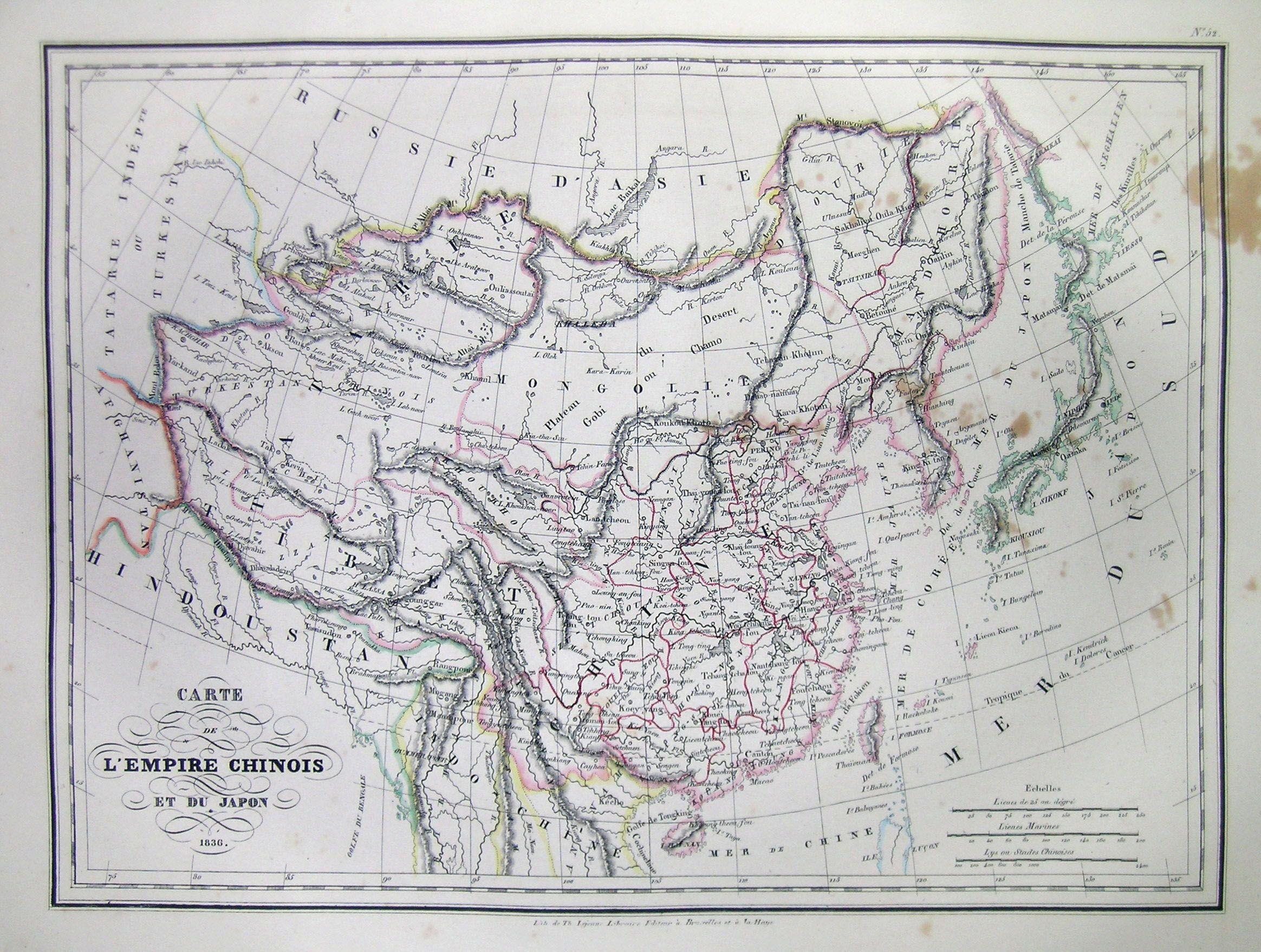
An 1837 edition of a Malte-Brun Map of China. This is one of the earliest maps to use the term Manchuria (Mandchourie), which Conrad Malte-Brun and Mentelle promoted as early as 1804.

Malte-Brun arrived in France in November 1799, and began work on a geography treatise meant as a gift to his adoptive country. A poem on the death of Andreas Peter Bernstorff which he published during his exile procured for him permission to return to Denmark. But another pamphlet against the aristocracy subjected him to a new prosecution, and he left his country, and finally took up his residence in Paris. In December 1800, the Danish courts pronounced sentence of perpetual banishment against him, which was rescinded about the time of his death. Malte-Brun's geography treatise was written with the help of Edme Mentelle, a professor at the École Normale; together, they produced Géographie mathématique, physique et politique de toutes les parties du monde (6 vols., published between 1803 and 1812).

He was a regular contributor to Journal des Débats. He at first opposed the consular government, but subsequently became a zealous imperialist, and after the fall of Napoleon an equally zealous monarchist, publishing in 1824 Traité de la légitimité considérée comme base du droit public de l'Europe chrétienne.

Aside from his political writings, he devoted himself especially to geographical studies. He was the founder of Les Annales des Voyages (in 1807) and Les Annales des Voyages, de la Géographie et de l'Histoire (in 1819), which encouraged observations and reports as a basis for research. He became well known after contributing Tableau de la Pologne, a treatise on the geography of Poland (in 1807, as the First Empire troops established French tutelage in the region). In 1822–1824, he served as the first general secretary of the newly founded Société de Géographie. Malte-Brun was the first person to suggest importing camels into Australia. See Australian feral camel.

The importance of Malte-Brun's work can be seen also in Albanology. In his sixth volume of Universal Geography published in 1826 an original Albanian alphabet is mentioned (erroneously thought to be from the first millennium), that opened a whole new research perspective followed by Johann Georg von Hahn, Leopold Geitler, Gjergj Pekmezi and others. Seven original Albanian alphabets have been discovered since.

He died in Paris in 1826, as he was drafting the final version of his major work, the Précis de Géographie Universelle ou Description de toutes les parties du monde. This appeared in eight volumes (1810–1829), the last two volumes being by Huot. Malte-Brun's name was given to streets in both Paris (20th arrondissement) and Thisted.
