= Alfred Brauner =

Austrian-French scholar, sociologist and author

Dr. Alfred Brauner
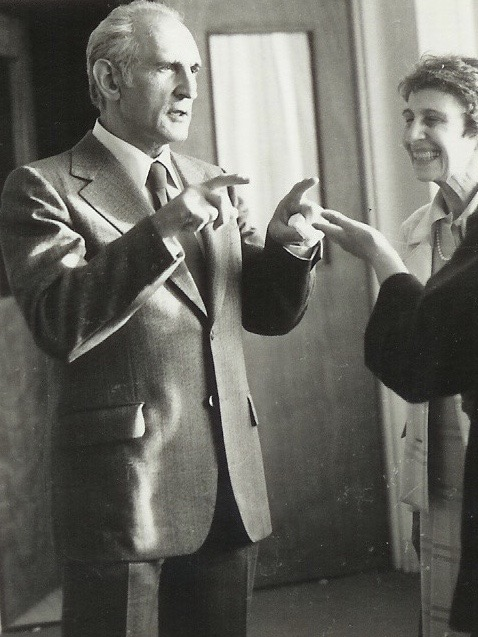
- Alfred and Fritzi Brauner in 1975
- Born: 3 July 1910; Saint-Mandé, Val-de-Marne, France
- Died: 1 December 2002 (aged 92); Paris, France
- Citizenship: French
- Known for: Sociology of childhood; child psychology; Autism
- Spouse: Françoise Brauner
- Awards: Hans-Prinzhorn Medal; First Prize, New York International Rehabilitation Film Festival

Academic background
- Education: PhD (1934); D.Litt. (1946)
- Alma mater: University of Vienna; University of Paris

Academic work
- Notable ideas: Analysis and collection of children's drawings in war (1902–2001)

Alfred Brauner (3 July 1910 – 1 December 2002) was an Austrian-born French scholar, author and sociologist, who was a volunteer in the International Brigades during the Spanish Civil War and an Austrian Resistance member during Occupied France. He has devoted his life to educating refugee, displaced and maladjusted children, participating in the welcoming of Jewish child survivors of the Kristallnacht and of the Nazi concentration camps of Buchenwald and Auschwitz from 1939 to 1946. An early writer on infantile autism, he also pioneered the analysis of children's drawings in war, creating from 1937 the first collection of drawing-testimonials to offer a unique perspective of the major conflicts of the 20th century through the eyes of children.

== Background in Austria and education ==
Born on 3 July 1910 in Saint-Mandé to Austro-Hungarian parents spending two years in France for professional purpose, Alfred Brauner grew up in Vienna, Austro-Hungary. His maternal uncle, Erwin Wexberg, was an Austrian-born American neuro-psychiatrist and one of the pioneers of individual psychology. In Vienna, his family held private classical music concerts at the Palais Esterházy, where Sigmund Freud was an invited guest. In his childhood, he experienced himself the repercussions of the war and witnessed his father leaving for the First World War to serve in the Austro-Hungarian army. To save him from the epidemics, during the World War I, his parents sent him to a family in Moravia. In 1928, in a summer camp for students in Austria, he met his wife Fritzi Erna Riesel whom he married in 1936. He defended his doctoral thesis at the University of Vienna in 1934, entitled "The Unanimism of Jules Romains", a correspondence starting between the young Viennese doctoral student and Jules Romains. Brauner served in the French army from 1939 and was awarded the Croix de Guerre 1939-1945, mentioned in dispatches by his division. In 1946, he defended a thesis at the University of Paris on "The Psychic Repercussions of Modern War on Childhood" and the same year presented a complementary thesis entitled "Plan, Organization and Results of the Rehabilitation Center for Juvenile Offenders in Kaiserebersdorf near Vienna (Austria)." His younger brother William emigrated to the United States after Kristallnacht and died on 6 October 1948 in the 1948 Georgia USAF Boeing B-29 crash, which resulted in the landmark Supreme Court case United States v. Reynolds.

== Life and career ==
Alfred Brauner began his professional activity as an educator in a rehabilitation center for juvenile offenders at Kaiserebersdorf in Vienna from 1928 to 1933. During the Spanish Civil War, he volunteered in the International Brigades and was placed by Luigi Longo at the head of a committee to help evacuees or refugees, because of his previous experience with at-risk youth. It is a home for children evacuated from Madrid and Asturias after the bombing of Guernica, the goal being to help the Spanish children of Republican territories, in the country and in the combat zone. Finally, Alfred returned to France after the defeat of the Spanish Republic.

In 1937, Alfred Brauner and his wife Fritzi discovered the trauma of child victims of war after receiving a set of drawings from a class in Barcelona. In addition to Catalan schoolchildren who were fortunate enough to stay in their school, they were refugees from Madrid who had witnessed tragic events. The Brauners made a psychiatric analysis of the children's drawings, which was for them a privileged mode of graphic expression of the young child. They highlighted what seemed to them characteristic of the child's drawing in the war, taking notes, creating medical records and questionnaires. The drawings and writings of children of the Spanish Civil War were the result of a contest organized by Alfred Brauner among the children of Barcelona on three themes: "My life Before the War – What I Saw from the War – How I See My Life after the War." It was then the beginning of their work on children caught in the middle of war. 4,000 drawings of refugee children and numerous essays were collected in Spain, which later, along with other drawings of children in war, offered a unique testimony of the conflicts of the 20th century through the eyes of children. Their project to publish drawings and testimonies of children in war received the support of Ilya Ehrenburg and Romain Rolland who "regarded this collection as of considerable educational, historical and human interest."

In 1939, Alfred Brauner welcomed 130 Jewish children from the Palatinate, Berlin and Austria, survivors of the Kristallnacht at the Château de la Guette owned by the Rothschild family and made available by Baroness Germaine de Rothschild. Brauner's intention was to analyze the problems posed in working with children traumatized by their experiences and by separation from their families, with the aim of adapting them to a new life and preparing them for integration into France. Some of the children had lost their parents; others had witnessed the atrocities of persecutions and were incapable of depicting their experience in their drawings until Brauner suggested the writing of a "book" about two children called Peter and Liselotte, to which everyone was to contribute. Alfred Brauner then described this educational experience in his D.Litt. dissertation, defended in 1946, entitled "The Psychic Repercussions of Modern War on Childhood."

In 1940, Alfred Brauner and his wife Fritzi attempted to hide about 10,000 children's drawings when the German army invaded Paris, but almost all were discovered and destroyed by the Gestapo. From January 1941, the Brauners entered the French Resistance and welcomed the Austrian resistance’s leadership to their Rue Bonaparte apartment in Paris. With members of the Austrian Freedom Front arriving every morning at a specific time, Alfred Brauner decided to open a German Language class as a cover from Gestapo.

In 1945, the Brauners helped welcoming 444 surviving boys from the Auschwitz and Buchenwald concentration camps, aged 8 to 16 years old, in the scope of the Oeuvre de Secours aux Enfants (OSE) in Ecouis, France. The children being in a physical and moral state defying description, the Brauners did not ask them to draw their past experiences in the Nazi concentration camps. Most of the children, however, turned to handwork and drew posters for the events in the home. Only one of the boys depicted his past experience in a carving of two children coming through a barbed wire fence, given to the Brauners as a gift. This welcoming of Buchenwald's child survivors in children's homes inspired the script of the film Nina's House, as well as the documentary The Boys of Buchenwald.

Alfred and Fritzi Brauner have analyzed children's drawings collected from around the world from children in about 20 countries at war, including the Boer War, WWI, the Spanish Civil War, Nazi Germany, Poland 1939, concentration camps, Hiroshima-Nagasaki, Polisario, the Israeli-Palestinian Conflict, the Lebanon War, Algerian War, Western Sahara War, El Salvador, Afghanistan, the Gulf War, Bosnia, and Chechnya. The Brauners compared their work with refugee children to "saving someone from a fire" and exhibited these children's drawings as part of their anti-war efforts, in the hope that atrocities will not be repeated. According to them, in countries where violence is prevalent, children's drawings are characterized by their realism and their substance owes nothing to the imagination. The Brauners' aim was to show that children are not blind and feel deep resentment toward the person who started the fire to torture human beings.

In 1950, Alfred Brauner created the "Practical Research Group for Children", which brings together professionals of childhood to develop medico-pedagogical methods intended for the education of children with mental disabilities. In 1955, he founded a day hospital for mentally and physically handicapped children located in the center of Paris, then transferred to Saint-Mandé, and worked on the rehabilitation of these children, giving priority to their education. He helped families of children who are handicapped from birth to lead lives as normal as possible, without sacrificing the whole family's well-being to that of the child's. Alfred Brauner was the ambassador of the association Children Refugees of the World, as well as the only non-physician Chairman of the French Society of Psychopathology of Expression and Art Therapy. He was awarded the Hans Prinzhorn medal of the German-speaking Society for Art and Psychopathology of Expression (DGPA) in 1976. In 1986, Jacques Chaban-Delmas presented him with the medal of the city of Bordeaux.

From 18 January to 10 February 1999, at the UNESCO headquarters in Paris, an exhibition was held with more than 200 drawings of children who lived through war. Entitled "I’ve Drawn the War. A Century of Drawings of Children in Wars (1900–1999)", under the high sponsorship and under the patronage of Simone Veil, these drawings-testimonials belonging to the Brauner collection revealed the impact of the extreme violence of war for the child. This exhibition, which was considered part of the "World Heritage", was then shown in Hiroshima, Jerusalem, Budapest, Vienna just to mention a few and more than 40 cities in Germany.

From 7 to 9 December 2011, a tribute to the 100th anniversary of the birth of Alfred and Françoise Brauner was organized at UNESCO Headquarters, with the organization of an international colloquium entitled "Childhood in War. Testimonies from Children about War."

== Honours and awards ==
- 2002: Premio Margherita Zoebeli, "La bussola dell’educazione", Rimini, Italy
- Ambassador of the association Children Refugees of the World
- 1986: Medal of the city of Bordeaux, France
- 1981: Prize for the book Living with an Autistic Child, Biblioteca Italiana Per Ciechi "Regina Margherita", Villa Reale, Monza, Italy
- 1979: First Prize, International Rehabilitation Film Festival in the category Mental Health Professional for the film: House without windows, New York City, United States.
- 1976: Hans-Prinzhorn Medal, German-speaking Society for Art and Psychopathology of Expression (DGPA), Germany
- 1970: 3rd Prize, for the film: Actors IQ +/-50, 6th Congress of the International Society of Psychopathology of Expression (SIPE), Istanbul, Turkey
- 1970–1973: Chairman of the French Society of Psychopathology of Expression and Art Therapy
- 1967: Prize of the Best Use of Art Therapy for the film: Three Psychotic Children Speak Up, 5th Congress of the International Society of Psychopathology of Expression (SIPE)
- Croix de guerre 1939–1945 (War Cross), mentioned in dispatches by his division

=== Major works by Brauner ===
The titles of the following publications have been translated from German or French into English and have been put in brackets.

==== Theses ====
- (1946), Plan, organisation et résultats de la maison de rééducation de l'enfance délinquante à Kaiser-Ebersdorf, près de Vienne, Autriche (Plan, Organization and Results of the Rehabilitation Center for Juvenile Offenders in Kaiserebersdorf near Vienna, Austria) (in French), complementary thesis, University of Paris La Sorbonne.
- (1946), Les répercussions psychiques de la guerre moderne sur l'enfance (The Psychic Repercussions of Modern War on Childhood) (in French), Higher doctorate (thèse d’État), University of Paris La Sorbonne.
- (1934), Der Unanimismus Jules Romains (The Unanimism of Jules Romains) (in German), Ph.D. thesis, University of Vienna.

==== Individual work ====
- (1997), Psy, es-tu là ? (Pdoc, are you in?) (in French), Saint-Mandé: Groupement de recherches pratiques pour l'enfance (G.R.P.E.), ISBN 2-9511382-0-2
- (1976), Les Enfants des confins (in French), Paris: Grasset, ISBN 2-246-00359-8
- (1963), Titine et l'éducation moderne. Une satire. (Titine and the Modern Education. A Satire.) (in French), Saint-Mandé: G.R.P.E.
- (1956), Pour en faire des hommes. Étude sur le jeu et le langage chez les enfants "inadaptés sociaux" (Study on play and language in « socially maladjusted » children), Paris: S.A.B.R.I.
- (1951), Nos livres d'enfants ont menti ! (Our Childhood Books Lied to Us!) (in French), Paris: S.A.B.R.I., (preface by Henri Wallon).
- (1946), Ces enfants ont vécu la guerre (These Children Have Lived through the War) (in French), Paris: Éditions Sociales Françaises.

==== Collective work ====
- (2001), (with Brauner F.), L'expression dramatique chez l'enfant : pris dans une guerre, handicapé mental (The Dramatic Expression in Children: Caught in the War, Special Need) (in French), Saint-Mandé: Groupement de recherches pratiques pour l'enfance (G.R.P.E.).
- (1994), (with Brauner F.), L'accueil des enfants survivants, (The Welcoming of the Child Survivors) (in French), Saint-Mandé: G.R.P.E.
- (1991), (with Brauner F.), J'ai dessiné la guerre. Le dessin de l'enfant dans la guerre (I've Drawn the War. Children's Drawings in the War) (in French), Paris: Éditions scientifiques françaises, ISBN 2-7046-1378-8
- (1986), (with Brauner F.), L'Enfant déréel : histoire des autismes depuis les contes de fées. Fictions littéraires et réalités cliniques (History of Autism since the Fairy Tales) (in French), Toulouse: Privat, ISBN 2-7089-7426-2
- (1982), (with Brauner F.), Vivre avec un enfant autistique (Living with an Autistic Child) (in French), Paris: PUF, 2nd Ed., ISBN 2-13-037414-X
- (1978), (with Brauner F.), L'expression psychotique chez l'enfant (The Psychotic Expression in Children) (in French), Paris: PUF.
- (1978), (with Brauner F.), Vivre avec un enfant autistique (Living with an Autistic Child) (in French), Paris: PUF, ISBN 2-13-037414-X

Spanish translation: (1981), Vivir con un nino autistico, Barcelona: Paidos Iberica Ediciones S A, ISBN 978-8475091143

Italian translation: (2007), Vivere con un bambino autistico, Florence: Giunti Editore, ISBN 978-8809041141

- (1976), (with Brauner F.), Dessins d'enfants de la guerre d'Espagne (Children's Drawings of the Spanish Civil War), Saint-Mandé: G.R.P.E.
- (1938), Brauner, Alfred (dir.) (under the alias Fred Braunier) (with Longo Luigi, Révai Dezső and Reuter Walter), The Spanish Children and the International Brigades; (translation in 5 languages : Les enfants espagnols et les Brigades internationales; Die spanischen Kinder und die Internationalen Brigaden; Spanelské deti an Internacionalni Brigády), Barcelona: Comité Pro-Niños Españoles de las Brigadas Internacionales.

==== Academic papers (selected) ====
- (2003), "Biographie du docteur Françoise Brauner" (Biography of Dr. Françoise Brauner) (in French), Sud/Nord, (Vol.18): p. 167–173.
- (2003), "L'extermination des Boers, il y a cent ans" (The Extermination of Boers, a hundred years ago) (in French), Sud/Nord, (Vol.18): p. 30–33.
- (2000), (with F. Brauner), "Des guerres et des enfants handicapés mentaux" (Wars and Special Needs Children) (in French), Revue Européenne du Handicap Mental: p. 29–37.
- (1999), "Ces enfants ont vécu la guerre. Les enfants de La Guette. Souvenirs et documents (1938–1945)" (These Children Have Lived through the War. La Guette Children. Memories and documents) (1938–1945) (in French), Center of Contemporary Jewish Documentation (CDJC): p. 57.
- (1986), (with F. Brauner), "Pictures from an exhibition, Children in War: Drawings from the Afghan Refugee Camps" (in English), (Preface by Sayed B. Majrooh), Central Asian Survey, Incidental Papers Series No 5, London, Society for Central Asian Studies.
- (1986), (with F. Brauner), "Children's Drawings and Nuclear War" (in English), The Journal of the American Medical Association, (Vol. 256): p. 613–616
- (1985), (with F. Brauner), "Les enfants déportés pendant la deuxième guerre mondiale et leurs descendants" (The Deported Children during the Second World War and their Descendants) (in French), Revue de Neuropsychiatrie de l'enfance et de l'adolescence, (No 6): p. 251–259.
- (1976), (with F. Brauner) "Kindersprache ohne Verständigung" (Children's language without communication) (in German), Bibliotheca Psychiatrica, (No. 154): p. 139–144.
- (1975), (with F. Brauner) "Les routes dans les fantasmes des enfants psychotiques" (The roads in the fantasies of psychotic children) (in French), Confinia Psychiatrica, (Vol. 18): p. 139–145.
- (1973), (with F. Brauner and M. Pelletier), "Observations sur l’expression par le modelage d’enfants dits psychopathologiques" (Observations on the Expression by the Modelling of Children with Psychopathological Disorders) (in French), Expression et Signe, (Vol. 3): p. 24–48.
- (1972), (with C. Launay and F. Brauner), "Les conduites thérapeutiques en présence des troubles du langage chez l’enfant" (Therapeutic Management in the Presence of Language Disabilities in the Infant) (in French), Le Progrès Médical Neuro. Psychiat., (Vol. 100): p. 339–343.
- (1939), (under the alias Fred Braunier), "Les enfants espagnols sous les bombes" (Spanish Children under Bombs) (in French), L'Ecole Libératrice, (Vol. 10): p. 264. "La guerre d'Espagne dans les dessins d'enfants" (The Spanish War in Children's Drawings) (in French), ibid. p. 348.

==== Filmography (selected) ====
- Pour en faire des hommes, Cinemath, Sandoz.
- Trois enfants psychotiques s’expriment (Three Psychotic Children Speak up), Cinemath, Sandoz, Paris.
- Loin du monde (Far from the World) (autism), Cinemath, Sandoz.
- Comédiens QI +/-50 (Actors IQ +/-50), Cinemath Sandoz et Spécia, Tours : (3rd prize), Istanbul, Turkey, 1970; Certificate of Merit Award, International Rehabilitation Film Festival, New York City, 1979.
- Maison sans fenêtres (House without Windows), Cinemath, Sandoz et Spécia, 1979 : First Prize, International Rehabilitation Film Festival, New York City, 1979).
- Enfants-masques (Children-Masks), Cinemath, Sandoz.
- Inadaptés de 15 à 20 (Maladjusted from 15 to 20), G.R.P.E.

=== Bibliography ===
- (2019), Gallardo Cruz José Antonio, La infancia en la guerra civil española (1936–1939). Cines y teatros dibujados por niños, (in Spanish), Malaga: Universidad de Malaga, ISBN 9788417449865.
- (2016), Schütz Edgar, Österreichische JournalistInnen und Publizistlnnen im Spanischen Bürgerkrieg 1936 – 1939 (in German), Vienna: LIT Verlag, ISBN 9783643507594.
- (2013), Duroux Rose and Milkovitch-Rioux Catherine, Enfances en guerre. Témoignages d'enfants sur la guerre (in French), Geneva: L'Équinoxe Georg, ISBN 9782825710180.
- (2012), Duroux Rose and Milkovitch-Rioux Catherine, I have Drawn Pictures of the War. The Eye of Françoise and Alfred Brauner (in English), Blaise Pascal University Press, ISBN 9782845165496.
- (2008), Landauer Hans and Hackl Erich, Lexikon der österreichischen Spanienkämpfer: 1936–1939 (in German), Vienna: Verlag der Theodor Kramer Gesellschaft ISBN 9783901602337.
- (2005), Ghozlan Eric and Hazan Katy, To life! The children of Buchenwald from the Shtetl to the OSE (in French), (preface by Elie Wiesel), Paris: Le Manuscrit / Fondation pour la Mémoire de la Shoah, ISBN 9782748151022.
- (1996), Pasteur Paul, Kreissler Félix, Actes du Colloque. Les Autrichiens dans la Résistance (proceedings of the conference: "Austrians in the Resistance") (in French), Centre d'études et de recherches autrichiennes, Rouen: University of Rouen Press, ISBN 9782877752138.

=== Articles ===
- (2013), Población Félix, Los Brauner y los dibujos de los niños de las guerras (in Spanish), Crónica Popular.
- (2010), Mouchenik Yoram, Les enfants dans la guerre. Entretien avec Alfred BRAUNER, L'Autre, (Vol. 11), p. 10–17 (in French).
- (2006), Ripa Yannick, Naissance du dessin de guerre. Les époux Brauner et les enfants de la guerre civile espagnole, dans Vingtième Siècle : Revue d'histoire, (No 89), p. 29–46 (in French).
- (2004), Guillermo Casañ, Benicàssim, hospital de las Brigadas Internacionales (Etapas Dumont y Ritterman), Aula militar, (in Spanish).
- (2003), Perrier Edmond, À Alfred Brauner, Sud/Nord, (No 18), p. 11-11 (in French).
- (1998), Kuhr Anja, Ich hab’ den Krieg gezeichnet. Kinderzeichnungen aus sechs Jahrzehnten, in Wissenschaft & Frieden: Kinder und Krieg (in German).
- (1947), Mauco Georges, Brauner Alfred. – Ces enfants ont vécu la guerre, Population, (Vol. 2), p. 383–384 (in French).

== See also ==
- Childhood in War
- International Brigades
- Oeuvre de Secours aux Enfants
- Österreichische Freiheitsfront
