= Brawn (surname) =

Brawn is a surname. Notable people with the surname include:

- Anna Livia Julian Brawn (1955–2007), American writer
- Billy Brawn (1878–1932), English footballer
- Frederick Brawn (1857–1936), Australian politician
- Miranda Brawn, British businesswoman, non-executive director, lawyer, and philanthropist
- Ross Brawn (born 1954), British Formula One managing director
