= Braune =

Braune is a German surname. Notable people with the surname include:

- Christian Wilhelm Braune (1831–1892), German anatomist
- Werner Braune (1909–1951), German Nazi SS officer, executed for war crimes
- Wilhelm Braune (1850–1926), German philologist and Germanist

== See also ==
- Braun (disambiguation)
