= V. G. Braun-Dusemond =

German painter

Valentin Gerhard Braun-Dusemond (born Gerhard Braun; 1919–1998), was a German painter and art dealer. He lived and worked in several countries, including Kenya and Malta, and his work embraced both Abstract Expressionist and Impressionist styles.

== Early life and influences ==
Braun-Dusemond was born in Cologne, Germany, where his father, Dr Siegfried Braun, was a school teacher in a Jewish School. He escaped from Nazi Germany to Kenya in 1939. Leaving Africa in 1963, he settled in Malta and took on the name of Dusemond. This was the name of the small village on the Mosel from which his father's family came. Mond was the maiden name of his mother, who came from Werl in Westphalia.

It was Braun-Dusemond's encounters with the German Expressionist, Ludwig Meidner which first inspired him to become a painter. Meidner had come to Braun-Dusemond's hometown of Cologne, in 1935, to take up a position as drawing master at the Jewish school, Javneh. Meidner's enthusiastic response to the young man's sketches and drawings encouraged him to develop his talent.

Dr Braun's thesis was on the art theorist and critic, Konrad Fiedler (1841–1895) who, in his Kunstwissenschaft, created the theory of pure form, rejecting the concepts of Beauty and Art. Since Fiedler believed that Works of Art are not created by feeling, he disregarded the importance of emotion in their appreciation. Braun-Dusemond's instinctive disagreement with such theories made him particularly receptive to the influences of German Expressionism with its emphasis on the supreme importance of the artist's personal feelings.

== Life and work ==
=== Escape from Nazi Germany ===
In 1939 Braun-Dusemond escaped the Gestapo and fled to Kenya, where thanks to his earlier training in Silesia at the Groß Breesen Jewish Farm School for Prospective Emigrants (Judische Auswandererlehrgut), he was permitted to emigrate. His emigration was facilitated by the Plough Settlements Association of London which, following the Evian conference in 1938, had opened up East Africa to settlement by sixty Jewish farmers. Within months of his arrival in Kenya, Braun-Dusemond was interned as an enemy alien in the British internment camps of Nakuru, Nairobi and Kabete. Here he was converted to Christianity by his fellow inmates – the Italian Consolata Missionaries - in September 1940 and adopted the name of Valentin since he was born on Valentine's Day.

=== Internment Art ===
Although beset by the humiliations of being a captive of the very people from whom he had sought salvation, Braun-Dusemond, was not too debilitated by his experience in the camps. Released from the fear of Nazi persecution and worries about money, he was able to draw and paint freely. He channeled the emotions caused by his condition into the production of a series of drawings and sketches. His artistic response to captivity was expressed in three ways – the realistic and abstract caricature of the camp population (clowns and masks abound in this strange human circus), the portrayal of the dream world beyond the prison gates (Africa in a burst of colour) and the Christianisation of his circumstances – Christ as captor and captive.

Following his release, in 1942, he enlisted in the British army as soon as former enemy aliens were free to do so. He joined the ranks of the Pioneer Corps and later became a non-commissioned officer in Allied counter-intelligence in Italy and Austria. He was one of the few enemy aliens to keep his German passport throughout his military service. The Reich Citizenship Law of November 1941 which had stripped him of his nationality only made him more determined not to yield it - 'To give up my German passport would have been to give in to Hitler. Hitler said I was not a German, but I proved him wrong.'

=== Kenya (1946-1963) ===
After the war Braun-Dusemond returned to Nairobi to set himself up as a painter, resisting all attempts by the German government to enrol him in their newly re-established foreign service. Painting whenever he could, he surmounted the obstacles caused by his lack of qualifications and his nationality and managed to earn a living by working as a journalist (writing for Der Spiegel and Reuters), cowboy, translator and cinema manager. In 1950 he became a founder member of the Nairobi Puppet Theatre. He painted the scenery for theatre performances at the Donovan Maule Theatre. Although Braun-Dusemond produced many colourful realistic paintings of his surroundings, his artistic inclinations were always focused on the abstract.

Early in 1951 he took his paintings with him to London, where he showed them to Sir William Coldstream, the director of the Slade School of Fine Art. Coldstream was so impressed that he accepted him immediately, waiving both the entrance examination and the fees for two terms. Braun-Dusemond received a bursary from the Society of Friends (Quakers) and a grant from the Helen Hay Whitney Foundation. Returning to Africa in the autumn of 1951, Braun-Dusemond was appointed to sit on the selection committee of the Kenya Arts Society of which he became vice president. Braun's paintings began to sell both in Kenya (George Vamos, the architect of the multi-racial United Kenya Club, was one of his customers) and in the John Whibley Gallery, London. He exhibited frequently at The Atelier in Nairobi and had exhibitions throughout East Africa. While establishing a name for himself Braun-Dusemond, recalling his own encounters with prejudice, was also eager to encourage young African artists. Interviewed by Drum Magazine, in 1959, Braun-Dusemond said, 'The quicker we get politics away from a racial squabble, the better for all of us.' In 1959 he opened the New Stanley Art Gallery in Nairobi which was frequented by film stars and white hunters.

=== The Mediterranean (1963-1976) ===
In 1963, fearing political upheaval following Kenya's Independence, Braun-Dusemond abandoned his successful business and travelled to South Africa, Israel and Cyprus in search of a new place to paint. Plans to set up a gallery in the Dome Hotel, Kyrenia, had to be abandoned because they coincided with the eruption of violence in Cyprus. Braun-Dusemond and his wife (Ruth Hornby-Waring) and two children had to be escorted out of Kyrenia in a German Embassy car. Braun-Dusemond finally settled in Malta in 1966. There he established The Mdina Gallery and called himself Dusemond.

With the change of name came the transformation of style as he moved out of his African Abstract phase into the creation of dreamy Mediterranean landscapes. Abandoning the vivid multi-colour oils and large canvases of his youth, Braun-Dusemond took up painting with watercolour and gouache. His African Tachiste fantasies were transmuted into unique landscapes bathed in ochre and green and tinged with a beguiling gold. The sharp light of the equator had yielded to the muted tones of the Mediterranean. Braun-Dusemond lived with his growing family (he had six children) in Palazzo Gourgion in the shadow of the Cathedral of the 'silent city' of Mdina. His customers – mainly German tourists - were intrigued by Braun-Dusemond's personality and history as much as by the originality of his work. He had good contacts with the German Embassy in Malta which encouraged his success. In 1976 he welcomed the former German Chancellor, Willy Brandt, to Mdina. He maintained his links with the European art scene through his cosmopolitan customers. The journalist and patron of the arts, Hans Wallenberg, the painter Katerina Wilczynski and the sculptor Trude Bunzl all purchased his work. As well as developing his own career Braun-Dusemond was eager to encourage a whole series of young Maltese artists, including John Borg Manduca and Mary de Piro.

== Renewed exile, retirement and death ==
The Mediterranean idyll did not last forever. In 1976 the Prime Minister, Dom Mintoff, expelled Braun-Dusemond and his family from Malta. Braun-Dusemond was obliged to return to Germany. Unable to settle in Germany because of the agony of his memories (much of his family had perished in The Holocaust), Braun-Dusemond moved to Britain from which he continued to sell his paintings to clients abroad – mainly in Germany where he had his two last exhibitions in Berlin (1977) and in Hamm (1981). He spent his last years living yet again in the shadow of a cathedral - this time that of Wells in Somerset.

== Galleries and museums ==
- 1950s
  - John Whibley Gallery, London
  - I.C.A. (Young Painters), London
  - Sorsbie Gallery, Nairobi
  - The Atelier Gallery, Nairobi
  - The Uganda Museum, Kampala
  - Thamos Papadopolous Museum, Tanga
  - Imperial Museum of Fine Arts, Addis Ababa
  - The Block Collection, Nairobi
  - Permanent Collection Kenya Arts Society
- 1960s
  - New Stanley Gallery, Nairobi
  - Pelikan Gallery, Baden-Baden
  - Grehan Museum, Beirut
  - Harwood Gallery, Los Angeles
- 1960s-1980s
  - The Mdina Gallery, Malta
  - Mignon Gallery, Bath
  - Galerie Brigitte Wolffer, Berlin
  - The Gustav-Lubcke Museum, Hamm
