= Márton Braun =

Hungarian politician

Member of the National Assembly
- In office 18 June 1998 – 5 May 2014

Personal details
- Born: 20 June 1963 (age 62) Szekszárd, Hungary
- Party: Fidesz
- Spouse: Katalin Braunné Fülöp
- Children: Marcell; Anna Luca
- Profession: politician

Márton Braun (born 20 June 1963) is a Hungarian politician, and member of the National Assembly (MP) for Szekszárd (Tolna County Constituency I) from 1998 to 2010. He became a Member of Parliament from Tolna County Regional List in 2010, holding the seat until 2014. He was a member of the Committee on European Affairs from 25 June 1998 until 5 May 2014. In June 2015, Braun was appointed CEO of Szerencsejáték Ltd., the largest gaming service provider in Hungary.

== Personal life ==
He is married to Katalin Braunné Fülöp. They have a son, Marcell, and a daughter, Anna Luca.
