= Carl Braun =

Carl Braun may refer to:

- Carl Braun (basketball) (1927–2010), American basketball player and coach
- Carl Braun (bass) (1886–1960), German opera singer
- Carl Braun (obstetrician) (1822–1891), Austrian obstetrician; knighted to Carl Ritter von Fernwald Braun

== See also ==
- Karl Ferdinand Braun (1850–1918), German physicist and inventor
- Karl Braun (politician) (1822–1893), German politician
