= Brugh =

Brugh or van Brugh is both a given name and a surname. Notable people with the name include:

- Jonathan Brugh, New Zealand comedian
- Johannes Pieterse van Brugh (1624–1697), Dutch merchant
- Peter Van Brugh Livingston (1710–1792), American merchant
- Van Brugh Livingston (1792–1868), American diplomat
