= Jonathan Braun =

American oncologist

Jonathan Braun is an American professor of pathology and pharmacology at the UCLA David Geffen School of Medicine.

== Early life ==
Braun was born in Cleveland, Ohio but got raised in Los Angeles where he initially took violin lessons. He obtained his bachelor's in chemistry and biology from the Stanford University in 1975 and later got both M.D. and Ph.D. from the Harvard Medical School where he studied with Emil Unanue.

== Career ==
He became a resident at the Brigham and Women’s Hospital and then became a postdoc fellow at the Whitehead Institute with became a chairman of both the Department of Pathology and Laboratory Medicine at the David Geffen School of Medicine and the National Scientific Advisory Committee. Currently he is a president of the Federation of Clinical Immunology Societies, is a director of the Clinical Translational Science Institute, and is also a co-director of tumor immunology at the Jonsson Comprehensive Cancer Center. He has written more than 140 peer reviewed articles.
