= Edgar Braun =

Former East German security officer (born 1939)

- Born: 9 June 1939 (age 87); Molbitz (Rositz), Thuringia, Germany
- Occupations: Senior Intelligence Officer (Stasi); Estate agent
- Political party: SED

Edgar Braun (born 9 June 1939) is a former Major general in the East German Ministry for State Security (MfS / "Stasi"). He was in charge of the service's Central Department for transport, mail and tele-communications ("Hauptabteilung / Section XIX").

== Life ==
Edgar Braun was born in Molbitz, some 30 km (18 miles) south of Jena, in Thuringia. His early years were marked by the war which broke out a few months after his birth, and involved the repeated destructive bombing of Molbitz which was adjacent to a Mineral Oil facility. His father worked as a dispatcher. In May 1945 the war ended and after the invading armies had rearranged themselves the whole of Thuringia became part of the Soviet occupation zone of what had been Germany. While Braun was at school, the occupation zone was transformed into a new separate German state, the German Democratic Republic, formally founded in October 1949. Directly after successful completion of his schooling, in 1957 he enrolled at the local office of the Ministry for State Security (MfS) in Altenburg. There followed a two-year training at the MfS Academy on the edge of Potsdam.

1959, the year of his twentieth birthday, was the year in which Edgar Braun joined East Germany's ruling SED (party), and it was also when he joined "Section II" of the service (counter-intelligence) in the Stasi's Leipzig district. In 1961 he was transferred to Berlin, still as a member of the counter-intelligence section. In 1977 he was promoted, becoming deputy head of "Section I" (internal security). In this capacity he was charged with hunting down suspected and actual dissenters inside The Service. It was later reported that three of the dissidents he had identified during this period were executed, the best known of the three in the west being Winfried Baumann, a naval captain who is believed to have been working for western intelligence.

Braun took a five-year correspondence course with the Karl Marx Party Academy which led in 1980 to a degree in Social Sciences. The Ministry then, in 1982, promoted him to "Section XIX" (transport, mail and tele-communications), of which shortly afterwards he took on the leadership in succession to Helmut Griebner. In 1986 he was raised to the rank of Major general.

November 1989 marked a terminal crisis for the East German regime, and it was the month in which Edgar Braun became a leading member of the National Security Office (AfNS / Amt für Nationale Sicherheit). This was a short-lived successor organisation to the Ministry for State Security (MfS). Braun's role within the AfNS is considered controversial by those who believe he used his position to try and force out the "Citizens' Committees" ("Bürgerkomitees") that had sprung up and were seeking to take over Stasi offices and preserve Stasi records that were likely to incriminate Stasi officers, Stasi collaborators and in some cases Stasi victims. There were also objections and that he tried, at the same time, to ensure amnesties for former Stasi officers and for their many secret collaborators as a quid pro quo for their silence.

Following German reunification, which formally took place in October 1990, Edgar Braun worked as a real estate agent. However, he continued to defend the interests of those who had served as officers and associates of his former service. In 1992 he was one of several former senior Stasi officers who signed an open letter to the regional prime ministers of the New Federal States (former East Germany), in which the signatories condemned the ongoing "witch-hunt" against former Stasi collaborators and called for "silent solutions, behind closed doors" ("stille Lösungen unter Ausschluss der Öffentlichkeit") in respect of disclosures of past Stasi activities. In 2003 he was one of those behind a two volume compilation entitled "Die Sicherheit, a justification of former Stasi-officers".

Edgar Braun is a member of the Society for legal and humanitarian support, an organisation created in 1993 by former East German government ministers and officials, Stasi officers and border guards to counter threats of legal action following in the wake of the regime change of 1990.

Braun continued to live in Berlin after his retirement.
