= Kira Braun =

German politician (born 1995)

Member of the Landtag of Saarland
- Incumbent
- Assumed office 25 April 2022

Personal details
- Born: 20 October 1995 (age 30)
- Party: Social Democratic Party (since 2012)

Kira Gabriele Braun (born 20 October 1995) is a German politician serving as a member of the Landtag of Saarland since 2022. From 2018 to 2022, she served as chairwoman of Jusos in Saarland.
