= Justin Braun =

Justin Braun may refer to:

- Justin Braun (ice hockey) (born 1987), American professional ice hockey player
- Justin Braun (soccer) (born 1987), American professional soccer player
- Justin Braun (sprinter) (born 2004), American sprinter, 2023 and 2024 All-American for the USC Trojans track and field team
- Justin Braun, a founding member of The Negatones
