= Fyodor Braun =

Russian-German scholar (1862–1942)

Friedrich Braun or Fyodor Aleksandrovich Braun (20 July 1862 – 14 June 1942) was a Russian-German scholar who provided philological and mythological backing for the Normanist theory.

Braun came to study Scandinavian and Germanic epics on the advice of Alexander Veselovsky. He graduated from St. Petersburg University in 1885 (with a gold medal for his thesis on Beowulf) and was a lecturer at the Bestuzhev Courses. He was appointed dean of the university's department of history and philology in 1905. His major writings, including an 1899 monograph on the relations between the Goths and Ancient Slavs, concern the history of Germanic peoples in Eastern Europe.

In 1920 Professor Braun was sent on a business trip to Germany, where he decided to remain. He joined the staff of the Leipzig University in 1922 and published a paper in support of the Japhetic theory. He retired from teaching 10 years later. Elena Rydzevskaya and Viktor Zhirmunsky were among his disciples.

In 1933 Braun signed the Vow of allegiance of the Professors of the German Universities and High-Schools to Adolf Hitler and the National Socialistic State.
