= Hans Henrik Bruun =

Danish sociologist and diplomat

Hans Henrik Eduard Reventlow Bruun (born 1943) is a Danish sociologist and diplomat. He is an MA in political science (cand.scient.pol.) from University of Aarhus. Through nearly thirty years, he served in the Danish diplomatic mission. From 1987 ambassador to Turkey, from 1999 to France. After his retirement from the foreign service, he joined the staff at the University of Copenhagen Institute for Sociology as an adjunct professor. In his academic field, he is an expert on the philosophy of Max Weber.
