= Von Braun =

Von Braun may refer to:

- Adolph Aloys von Braun (1818–1904), Austrian diplomat
- Amelie von Braun (1811–1859), Swedish educator
- Carl-Erik von Braun (1896–1981), Swedish tennis player
- Detlow von Braun (1912–1999), Swedish sailor
- Georg von Braun (1886–1972), Swedish equestrian
- Hendrik von Braun (1926–2003), American toy inventor
- Joachim von Braun (born 1950), German agricultural scientist
- Magnus von Braun (1919–2003), Chrysler Europe executive, Wernher's brother
- Magnus von Braun (senior) (1878–1972), German politician, Minister of Agriculture 1932–1933, father of the three von Braun brothers
- Peter von Braun (1758–1819), Austrian industrialist and patron of the arts
- Sigismund von Braun (1911–1998), German diplomat, Wernher's brother
- Wernher von Braun (1912–1977), influential aerospace engineer
- von Braun, lunar crater
- Von Braun, a fictional faster-than-light starship from the 1999 personal computer game System Shock 2
- Von Braun, a fusion-powered ship designed for a crewed mission to Jupiter in the manga and anime Planetes
- Von Braun, a fictional, robotic, slower-than-light starship in the Discovery Channel special Alien Planet
- von Braun reaction, a reaction in organic chemistry
- von Braun amide degradation, a second related reaction

== See also ==
- Braun (surname)
