= Geoffrey Bruun =

Canadian historian and biographer

Geoffrey Bruun (20 October 1898 – 13 July 1988) was a historian and biographer who taught at New York University from 1927 until 1941. He was born in Montreal, Quebec and received a bachelor's degree from the University of British Columbia, and master's and doctoral degrees from Cornell University. After retiring as a professor of history from N.Y.U., he was a visiting professor at Cornell, Mt. Holyoke College, Smith College, the University of Illinois, and Georgetown University.

He was the author of several books on European history, including Europe and the French Imperium, 1799–1814, published in 1938; Europe in Evolution, (1945) and Europe and America Since 1492 (1954), as well as a biography of Georges Clemenceau, the French statesman, published in 1943.

Although he wrote book reviews for the Saturday Review of Literature and other journals, Bruun is most widely known for his textbooks, including A Survey of European Civilization, which he wrote in collaboration with Wallace K. Ferguson and which has gone through several editions since its publication in 1936.

Bruun died at the age of 89 of a kidney ailment at his home in Ithaca, New York.
