= Brawn (disambiguation) =

Brawn is a meat dish.

Brawn may also refer to:

- Amadeus Cho, a fictional superhero from Marvel Comics also known as Brawn
- Brawn (Transformers), a fictional character from the various Transformers universes
- Brawn (surname), a family name
- Physical strength, the capacity for muscular force
- An episode of the television series The Batman
- Brawn GP, a former Formula One team

== See also ==
- Braun (disambiguation)
- Brown (disambiguation)
