= Michel Braun =

Luxembourgish sports shooter (1930–2021)

Personal information
- Born: 10 March 1930 Gonderange, Luxembourg
- Died: 4 November 2021 (aged 91)

Sport
- Sport: Sports shooting

Michel Braun (10 March 1930 – 4 November 2021) was a Luxembourgish sports shooter. He competed at the 1972 Summer Olympics and the 1976 Summer Olympics. Braun died on 4 November 2021, at the age of 91.
