= Hans Braun =

Hans Braun may refer to:

- Hanns Braun (1886–1918), German athlete
- Hans Braun (baritone) (1917–1992), Austrian operatic baritone
