= Steve Braun =

Steve Braun may refer to:

- Steve Braun (actor) (born 1976), Canadian television and movie actor
- Steve Braun (baseball) (born 1948), American baseball player
- Steve Braun (politician) (1959–2022), American businessman and politician
