= Karl Braun =

Karl Braun is the name of:

- Karl Braun (bishop) (born 1930), German Roman Catholic archbishop
- Karl Braun (politician, 1807), German jurist and politician
- Karl Braun (politician, 1822) (1822–1893), German politician and writer
- Karl Ferdinand Braun (1850–1918), German electrical engineer, inventor, physicist, and Nobel laureate
- Karl Braun (actor)
- Karl Braun (botanist) (1870-1935), German botanist

== See also ==
- Carl Braun Camera-Werk, also known as Karl Braun KG
