= Michael Braun =

Michael Braun may refer to:

- Michael Braun (industrialist) (1866–1954), German industrialist and pioneer of the undergarment industry
- Michael Braun (drummer) (born 1953), American drummer with Hall & Oates
- Mike Braun (born 1954), American politician
- Michael Braun (footballer) (born 1978), Australian rules footballer
