= Johanna Braun =

German writer

- Born: 7 May 1929; Magdeburg
- Died: 24 October 2008 (aged 79); Schwerin
- Occupation: Writer

Johanna Braun (7 May 1929 – 24 October 2008) was a German writer.

== Biography ==
Johanna Braun was born in Magdeburg on 7 May 1929. Her father was an optician. She spent most of her life living in East Germany and held a number of jobs including secretary and editor. From 1969 she was a fulltime writer. Braun married Günter Braun and together they published a vast array of work mostly aimed at the younger audience but with a number of books for adults. Braun also wrote science fiction. The couple also wrote a radio feature in 1976. The couple were critical of social conditions and for several years some of their works were only available in West Germany. Braun died in Schwerin in 2008.

== Bibliography ==
- The Great Magician's Error (1972)
- Uncanny Phenomena on Omega 11 (1974)
- The Mistake Factor (1975)
- Conviva Ludibundus (1978)
- The Utofant: A Periodical from the Third Millennium Found in the Future (1981)
- The Spherico-Transcendental Design (1983)
- The Inaudible Sounds (1984)
- "Pantamann" trilogy (1988–91)
