= Jim Braun =

American football player and coach

Playing career

Football
- 1967–1969: Concordia (IL)
- Position: Linebacker

Coaching career (HC unless noted)

Football
- 1970: Concordia (IL) (SA)
- 1979–1982: Concordia (MN)
- 1983–1996: Concordia (IL)

Head coaching record
- Overall: 58–101–4

Accomplishments and honors

Championships
- 2 Twin Rivers (1981–1982); 1 IBFC (1987)

Awards
- 2× IBFC Coach of the Year (1983, 1987)

Jim Braun is a retired American football coach. He served as the head football coach at Concordia University in Saint Paul, Minnesota from 1979 to 1982 and at Concordia University Chicago from 1983 to 1996, compiling a career college football coaching record of 58–101–4.

== Head coaching record ==
Year	Team	Overall	Conference	Standing	Bowl/playoffs
Concordia Golden Bears (Twin Rivers Conference) (1979–1982)
1979	Concordia	3–5–1			
1980	Concordia	3–6			
1981	Concordia	6–3		T–1st	
1982	Concordia	6–3		T–1st	
Concordia (MN):		18–17–1			
Concordia Golden Cougars (Illini–Badger/Illini–Badger–Hawkeye Football Conference) (1983–1996)
1983	Concordia	5–3–1	3–1		
1984	Concordia	3–5	2–2	T–2nd	
1985	Concordia	4–5	3–2	2nd	
1986	Concordia	2–6	2–3	4th	
1987	Concordia	7–2	5–0	1st	
1988	Concordia	4–5	2–2		
1989	Concordia	2–6–1	1–4–1	7th	
1990	Concordia	2–8	1–6		
1991	Concordia	2–6	1–5	6th	
1992	Concordia	5–5	3–3		
1993	Concordia	0–10	0–6	7th	
1994	Concordia	2–7–1	2–4	T–3rd	
1995	Concordia	1–8	0–6	7th	
1996	Concordia	1–8	0–5	6th	
Concordia (IL):		40–83–3	25–49–1		
Total:		58–101–4			
National championship Conference title Conference division title or championship game berth
