= Miranda Brawn =

British businesswoman, lawyer and philanthropist

Miranda K. Brawn
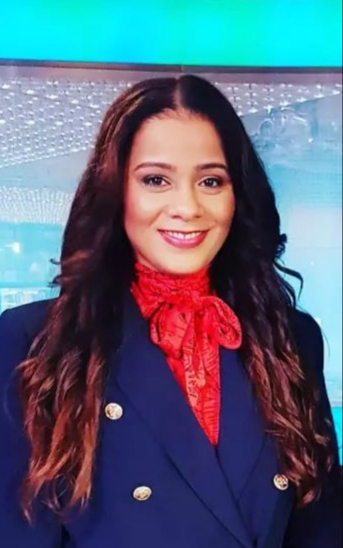
- Born: November 1974 (age 51); London
- Occupations: Businesswoman, lawyer, philanthropist
- Organization(s): The Miranda Brawn Diversity Leadership Foundation (founder and president)
- Board member of: Switch Mobility Limited (former Optare)

Miranda K. Brawn is a British businesswoman, non-executive director, lawyer, and philanthropist. She was born and raised in London. She founded The Miranda Brawn Diversity Leadership Foundation, a registered UK charity, in 2016. She is best known for her activism to eliminate diversity, equity, inclusion and sustainability gaps.

== Early life and education ==
Brawn is of Kashmiri descent on her father's side, while her maternal family are from Dominica.

Brawn completed the Bar Vocational Course at the University of Law in 2011 and was called to the Bar of England and Wales by The Honourable Society of Lincoln's Inn to become a Barrister-at-Law.

She also holds a Master of Business Administration (MBA) degree from the University of Westminster Business School. Brawn was elected to be a Fellow of the Royal Society of Arts in 2016.

She was awarded honorary Doctor of Letters from the University of Brighton in 2017 and honorary Doctor of Laws from the University of Law in 2019.

== Career ==
Brawn started her banking career as one of the first women of colour on London's trading floor, progressing to become an investment banker, hedge fund sales trader, and senior lawyer.

On 1 September 2022, Professor Miranda Brawn has been elected to be a senior visiting fellow at the University of Oxford, Keble College.

She was a candidate to be a City of London Alderman in May 2022.

On 1 July 2021, she was appointed to the corporate board of electric vehicle manufacturer Switch Mobility Limited (formerly known as Optare, a subsidiary of Ashok Leyland, part of the Hinduja Group’s global business group) as an independent non-executive director.

Brawn holds other board roles, which include serving as an advisory board member of The Honourable Society of Lincoln’s Inn for the Investment Committee, Social Mobility Committee, Chapel Committee, and Bar Representation Committee as of 1 January 2021.

Brawn also works as an Equality Commissioner at Lambeth Council as of 2016.

She was elected to the Board of the Black Cultural Archives (BCA) as Vice-Chair from 2014 to 2016, and then Patron from 2016 to 2018. In 2014, Brawn was also the first Patron of the Black British Academics.

Brawn is a media contributor for a range of media platforms and publications, including Bloomberg News, both television and radio.

== Philanthropy ==
=== The Miranda Brawn Diversity Leadership Foundation ===
Brawn founded and is the President of a UK-registered charity in England and Wales called The Miranda Brawn Diversity Leadership Foundation (TMBDLF). The mission of this charity is to eliminate the diversity, equity, and inclusion gaps in the professional workplace through education and empowerment for future diverse leaders. On 15 October 2016, the charity launched the UK’s first diversity leadership lecture, and on 1 March 2021, the UK’s first ‘Black Women on Boards’ initiative. Their work has been recognised by Prince of Wales, Prince Charles, former Prime Minister Theresa May, and the former Speaker of the House of Commons, John Bercow.

In 2021, Brawn launched The Dr Miranda Brawn Award with Oxford University in partnership with The Miranda Brawn Diversity Leadership Foundation. This award is to empower students from underrepresented groups to excel in the education and future careers.

=== Other charitable work ===
From 2017 to 2018, Brawn served on the Board of Cancer Research UK Women of Influence as a board advisor. In 2021, Brawn joined Action Aid UK Arise Fund as a founding board advisory member.

== Awards ==
- 2016 - Brawn was elected to be a Fellow of the Royal Society of Arts
- 2016 - UK Prime Minister 'Points of Light' Award
- 2016 - Highly Commended Diversity Champion by UK Diversity Legal Awards
- 2017 - Top 100 Most Influential Women in European Finance by Financial News
- 2018 - Honorary Freedom of the City of London by personal invitation for the centenary of votes for women.
- 2019 – The Empower Top 100 Ethnic Minority Executives 2019 Financial Times and Yahoo Finance & EMPower
- 2019 – Woman of the Year and Ambassador of the Year by the Women in Finance Awards
- 2019 - The HERoes Top 100 Role Model Women Executives 2019 by Yahoo Finance and EMPower
- 2020 - Top 10 Most Inspirational Women of the City by Brummell Magazine
- 2020 - Top 12 Inspirational Women in the City of London Photography Exhibition at London Guildhall Art Gallery by Hannah Starkey
