= United Kenya Club =

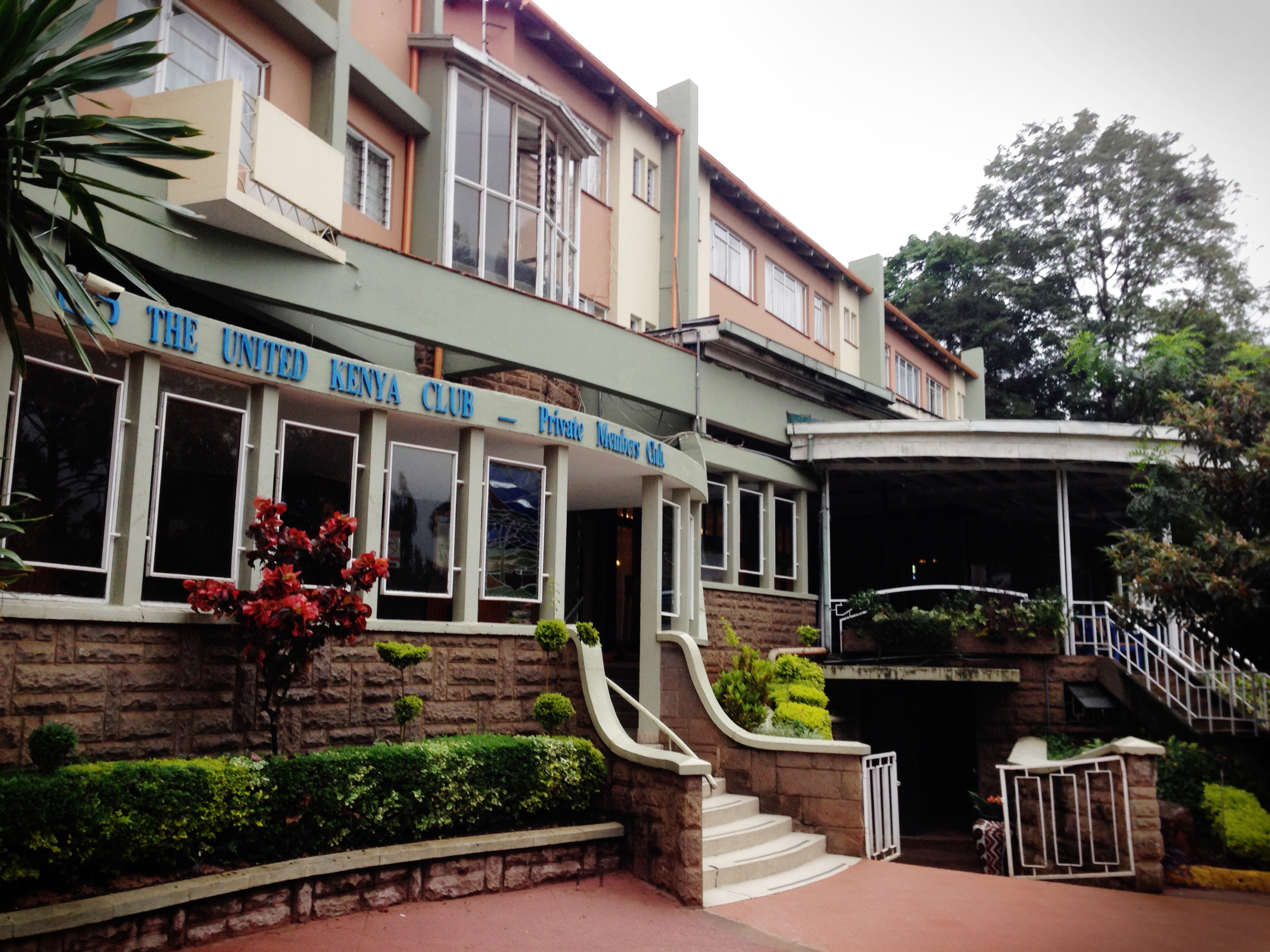
- Entrance to the United Kenya Club, 2019
- Formation: 1946; 80 years ago
- Location: Nairobi, Kenya
- Website: unitedkenyaclub.com

The United Kenya Club is a social and residential club in central Nairobi, Kenya. Founded in 1946, the club was intended as a center for intellectual discussion among Kenyans supporting a nonracial Kenyan society and future. The club provides accommodations, food, and maintains a continued intellectual and political role in Kenya.

== Founding ==
The United Kenya Club was formed in 1946, intended as a center of mixed-race social gatherings in Nairobi, and an institution where African visitors to the city could find accommodation. In his memoir, Kenyan industrialist Madatally Manji wrote that the club was founded by twelve members with diverse racial backgrounds, and that the club's first president was the liberal governor of Kenya, sir Philip Euen Mitchell. The club was founded with the intention of including support for socialization and accommodation in reciprocity with other, similar clubs in east Africa. Initially founded at the site of a small structure on Whitehouse Road (now Haile Selassi Avenue) in Nairobi, the club later acquired a permanent structure on State House Road next to the University of Nairobi, where it remains.

== Lectures and members ==
In the early 1950s, the United Kenya Club was frequented by Kenyans who believed that future Kenyan society should be multiracial. In the 1940s and 1950s most east African and Kenyan establishments effectively separated racial groups, or, like the Nairobi Rotary Club, had highly conservative views on racial integration. In many cases, different races in Kenya might meet in public places but would not mingle. By contrast the United Kenya Club allowed Africans, Europeans and Asians to socialize together in public.

Many early members of the United Kenya Club would later, after Kenyan independence, go on to become prominent business people and government officials. The club included membership by prominent figures including Legislative Councilman Kirpal Singh Sagoo and jurist Anver Jeevanjee, and featured weekly lunch lectures on aspects of Kenyan life, including a report by labor leader Tom Mboya, a presentation by photographer John Karmali, and a talk by writer Josiah Mwangi Kariuki.

== See also ==
- History of Kenya
- Kenya Colony
