= Harald E. Braun =

German historian

Harald E. Braun FRHistS

Academic background
- Education: Heidelberg University; University of Oxford
- Thesis: Scholasticism and Humanism in the Political Thought of Juan de Mariana, SJ : (1535-1624) (2000)

Academic work
- Institutions: University of Liverpool
- Notable works: Juan de Mariana and Early Modern Spanish Political Thought (2007)

Harald Ernst Braun, D.Phil. Oxon., FRHistS, is a German historian of late medieval and early modern political thought and culture (c.1450-c.1700), with an emphasis on the Spanish Habsburg empire and the Catholic world. His work integrates cultural, political and intellectual history by mapping the ways in which different fields of knowledge – such as legal, theological or historical knowledge – interlace and shape early modern political debate, processes, and decision-making. Braun is Associate Professor / Reader in European History (1300–1700) at the University of Liverpool. He has published six books as well as more than twenty chapters and articles in edited volumes and peer-reviewed academic journals. His publications include a study of the Spanish Jesuit theologian and historian Juan de Mariana as well as books on the histories of Reason of State, Spanish Scholastic political theology, Hispanic Baroque Culture, the Conscience in Early Modernity, and the History of Violence.

== Career ==
Braun took an MA in history, Politics, and German Language and Literature at Heidelberg University, German. A pupil of Professor Sir John H. Elliott, he received his D.Phil. on Early Modern Catholic Political Thought at the University of Oxford. He was a temporary Lecture at King's College London (KCL) and the London School of Economics (LSE) until he joined the Department of History at Liverpool in 2004.

Braun is the founding editor (with Professor Pedro Cardim, Universidade Nova de Lisboa) of the Routledge series of Early Modern Iberian History in Global Contexts: Connexions. He also is the founding editor of Renaissance and Early Modern Worlds of Knowledge, the book series of the Society for Renaissance Studies.

== Works ==
- Contexts of Conscience in Early Modern Europe (2004) with Edward Vallance
- Juan de Mariana and Early Modern Spanish Political Thought (2007)
- The Renaissance Conscience (2011) with Edward Vallance
- Theorising the Ibero-American Atlantic (2013) with Lisa Vollendorf
- The Transatlantic Hispanic Baroque: Complex identities in the Atlantic World (2016) with Jesús Pérez-Magallón
- A Companion to the Spanish Scholastics (2021) with Erik De Bom and Paolo Astorri
