= Florian Braun =

German politician (born 1989)

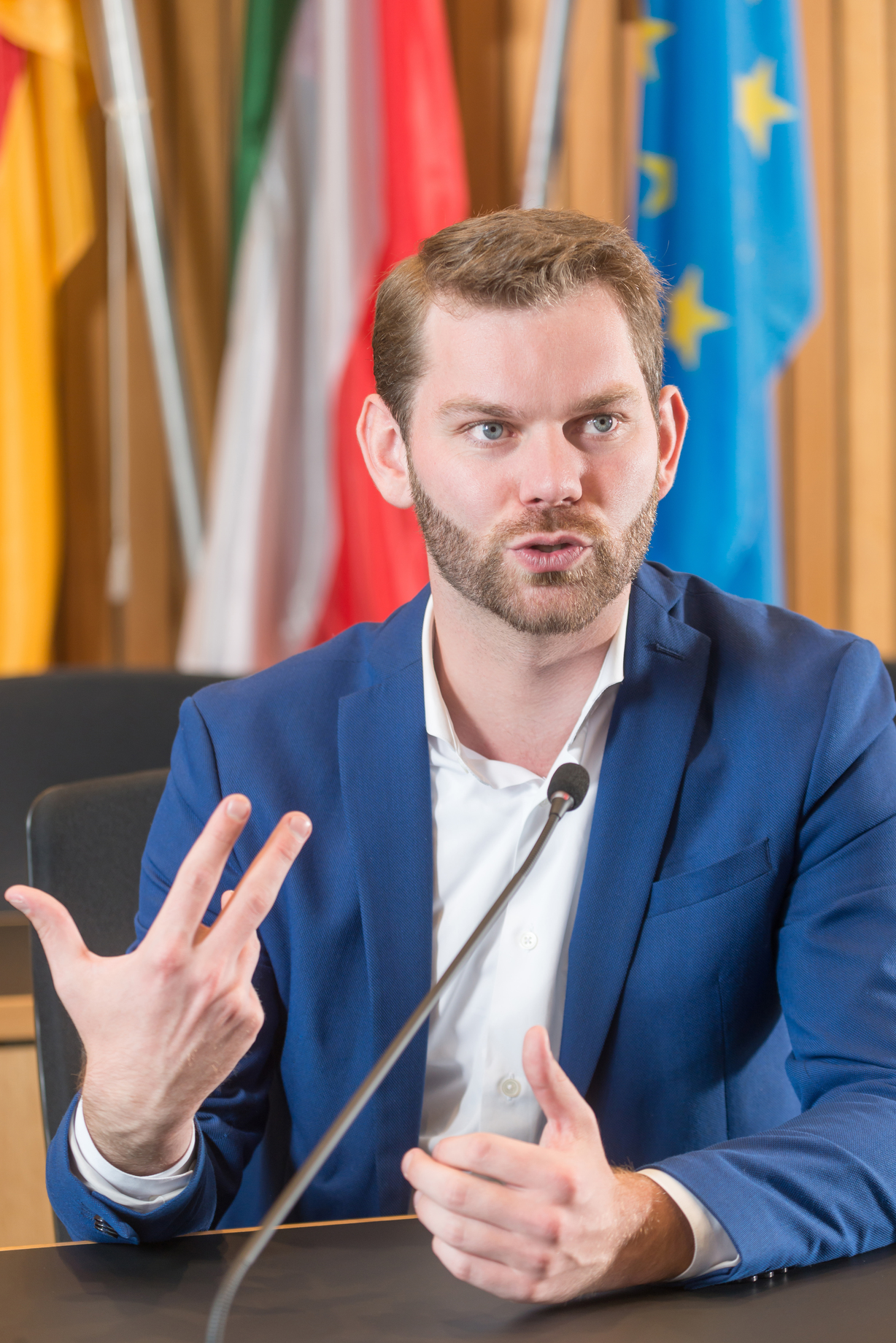
- Braun in 2018

Member of the Landtag of North Rhine-Westphalia
- Incumbent
- Assumed office 1 June 2017

Personal details
- Born: 2 June 1989 (age 36) Aachen
- Party: Christian Democratic Union (since 2004)

Florian Braun (born 2 June 1989 in Aachen) is a German politician serving as a member of the Landtag of North Rhine-Westphalia since 2017. From 2014 to 2020, he served as chairman of the Young Union in North Rhine-Westphalia.
