= Tim Braun =

Tim Braun may refer to:

- Timmy Braun, a former member of band Texas Hippie Coalition
- Tim Braun, television producer, son of Craig Braun and brother of Nicholas Braun
