= August Emil Braun =

German archaeologist (1809–1856)

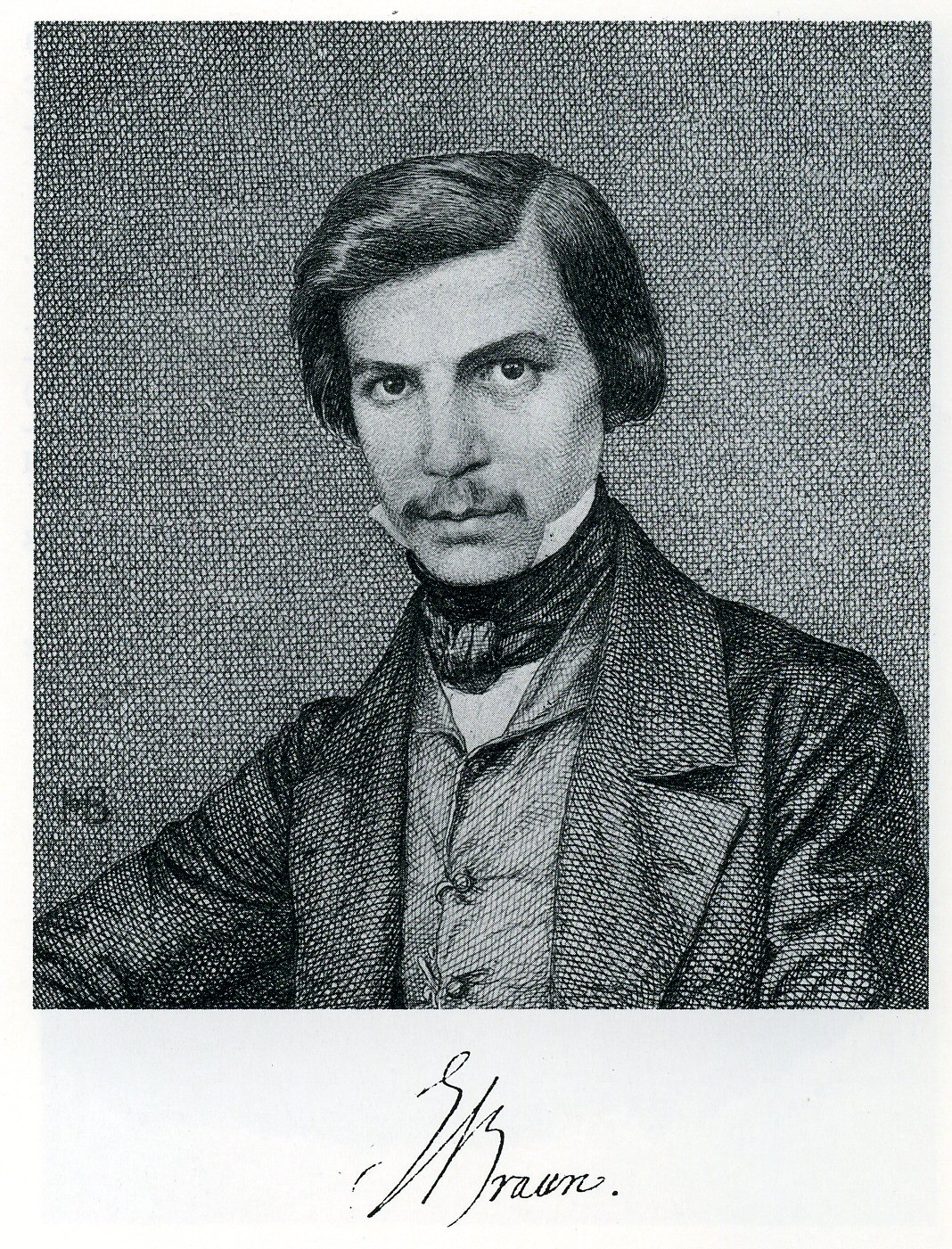
Braun portraited by an unknown artist, ca. 1840/45

August or Auguste Emil Braun (19 April 1809, Gotha, Germany – 12 September 1856, Rome, Italy) was a German archaeologist.

== Biography ==
Braun initially studied archaeology and philosophy at the University of Göttingen, then continued his education at the Ludwig-Maximilians-Universität München and the Technical Educational Institute Dresden. In 1833, he accepted Eduard Gerhard's invitation to Berlin, where he made the decision to devote his career to art history.

In the autumn of 1833, he accompanied Gerhard to Rome, where in a short amount of time, he became a librarian, and subsequently secretary to the Instituto di Corrispondenza Archeologica (later the German Archaeological Institute). In Rome, he used his contacts in the art market to acquire antiquities and paintings for collectors, and he established a electroplating workshop to create reproductions of ancient and modern works of art.

== Works ==
- Il giudizio di Paride (Paris, 1838) – The Judgement of Paris.
- Die Kunstvorstellungen des geflügelten Dionysios (Munich, 1839) - Artistic notions involving the winged Dionysus.
- Tages und des Hercules und der Minerva heilige Hochzeit (Munich, 1839) - Day of Hercules and Minerva's sacred marriage.
- Antike Marmorwerke (Leipzig, 1843) - Antique marble works.
- Die Schale des Kodros (Berlin, 1843) - The shell of the Kodros.
- Die Ficoronische Cyste (Leipzig, 1850) - The Ficoroni cista.
- Griechische Götterlehre (two volumes, Gotha, 1850–54) - Greek mythology
- Die Vorschule der Kunstmythologie (Gotha, 1854; English trans. by Grant, 1856)
- Die Ruinen und Museen Roms, für Reisende, Künstler, und Alterthumsfreunde (Braunschweig, 1854; English trans. London, 1855).
