= Dezső Révai =

Hungarian photographer and photojournalist

Dezső Révai

Dezső Révai (1903 - 1996) was a Hungarian photographer and photo journalist who is mainly known for his photographs taken during the Spanish Civil War.

== Career ==
=== Early years ===
He was born on 14 August 1903 as the fourth child of a secular Jewish family in Budapest, Hungary. By the age of 16 he was already a keen amateur photographer and had set up his own photo laboratory in the bathroom of the family home. During his early years he also developed an interest in social activism and joined the Hungarian Communist Party in 1926. His first photographs captured the life of the Communist Student Movement from that time. He eventually became the leader of a Photo Montage group that created communist propaganda materials. Due to these activities he was imprisoned twice in 1930 and 1934.

=== Paris ===
After he was released for the second time Dezső Révai emigrated to France leaving all his photo equipment and accessories behind. In Paris he opened his own photo laboratory at Rue Bellier Dedouvre. During his time in Paris Dezső Révai met and became acquainted with a wide circle of artists including Robert Capa, Ervin Marton, Brassaï, Picasso and other left wing activists.

=== Spanish Civil War and World War II ===
In 1936 Dezső Révai joined the Hungarian Unit of the International Brigades fighting in the Spanish Civil War. He fought and worked in the International Brigades and his photographs from this period were signed "Foto Turai". As a member of the propaganda department of the International Brigades he didn't only take photographs, but was also the editor of some publications and booklets released during the war. His most significant photographs from this period were the award-winning series of 'Metro Madrid' photographs taken in 1937 depicting the people of Madrid as they take shelter from the Nationalist air raids in the metro stations.

In 1939 the Spanish Civil War ended and the captured soldiers of the International Brigades were placed in Internment Camps. Together with his compatriots Dezső Révai was placed in Gurs and Vernet camp in southern France. With some of his fellow inmates he organized a secret photo laboratory where they prepared photographs, montages, booklets and other documents. With a handmade camera he managed to capture the everyday life in the camp. These extraordinary images were smuggled out of the camp and remain preserved in his archive of work to this day. Following two years of imprisonment he volunteered for work through the internment camp administration and was relocated to Germany. He soon escaped back to France and joined the Resistance between 1942-44.

=== Return to Hungary ===
After the end of World War II in 1945 he returned to Hungary and was appointed as head of the photography department at Mafirt known today as MTI. Later he was appointed director of the Hungarian Film Production Company. Many famous Hungarian films were produced during his time as director, including: 'Somewhere in Europe' (Valahol Európában), 'A Foot of Land' (Talpalatnyi fold), 'Ludas Matyi', 'Unusual Marriage' (Különös házasság), 'The Resurrected Sea' (Feltámadott a Tenger). From 1954 he worked as deputy head of the Hungarian TV and Radio and was responsible for the launch of the first Hungarian TV station.

On his retirement in 1962 he continued to work as a photographer well into his eighties producing many classic images used on postcards across Hungary.
