= Gerhard Braun =

German politician (1923–2015)

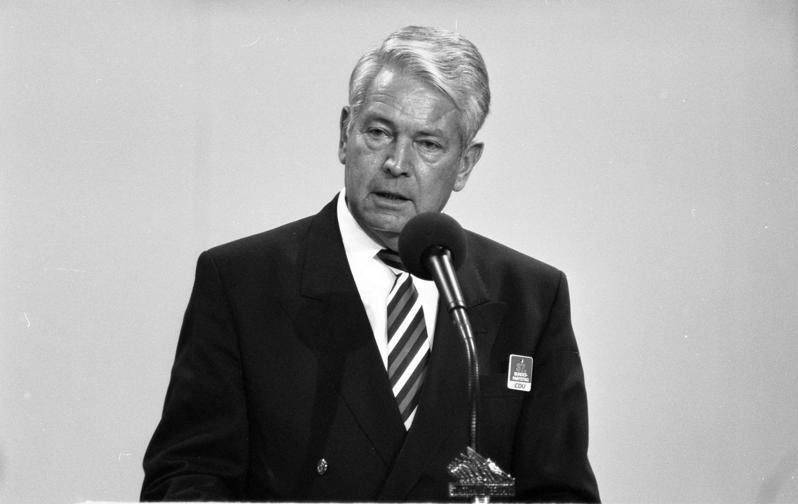
- Gerhard Braun, 1989

Member of the Bundestag
- In office 13 December 1972 – 18 February 1987

Personal details
- Born: 28 December 1923 Wermelskirchen, Rhine Province, Germany
- Died: 23 October 2015 (aged 91) Wermelskirchen, North Rhine-Westphalia, Germany
- Party: CDU

Gerhard Braun (December 28, 1923 – October 23, 2015) was a German politician of the Christian Democratic Union (CDU) and former member of the German Bundestag.

== Life ==
Braun joined the CDU in 1945, joined the Junge Union (JU) and was state secretary of the JU Rhineland from 1947 to 1955. From 1957 to 1960, he was deputy managing director of the Rhineland CDU, and from 1961 to 1966 he was state managing director. In 1979 he was elected to the Federal Executive Committee of the Kommunalpolitische Vereinigung. From 1985 to 1988 he was the CDU's senior citizens' representative. From 1988 to 1990 he was the first federal chairman of the Senioren-Union. Braun was a member of the city council of Wermelskirchen from 1961 to 1989. He was a member of the German Bundestag from 1972 to 1987. From 1976 to 1980 he represented the constituency of Remscheid in parliament. In all other electoral periods he entered the Bundestag via the state list of the CDU North Rhine-Westphalia.

== Literature ==
Herbst, Ludolf; Jahn, Bruno (2002). Vierhaus, Rudolf (ed.). Biographisches Handbuch der Mitglieder des Deutschen Bundestages. 1949–2002 [Biographical Handbook of the Members of the German Bundestag. 1949–2002] (in German). München: De Gruyter - De Gruyter Saur. p. 1715. ISBN 978-3-11-184511-1.
