= Peter Braun =

Peter Braun may refer to:

- Peter Braun (runner) (born 1962), German middle-distance runner
- Peter Braun (skier), West German para-alpine skier
- Peter Leonhard Braun (born 1929), German writer and radio producer

== See also ==
- Peter-Victor Braun (1825–1882), French Catholic priest
