= Harland Braun =

American lawyer (born 1942)

- Born: September 21, 1942 (age 84); New York City, New York
- Education: University of California, Los Angeles (B.A., J.D.)
- Occupation: Attorney

Harland W. Braun (born September 21, 1942) is an American criminal defense attorney, practicing in Los Angeles, California. His cases have included successfully defending John Landis and his co-defendant George Folsey Jr. in the Twilight Zone manslaughter trial, defending Rep. Bobbi Fiedler against bribery charges, successfully defending state criminal charges against one of the officers charged in the Rodney King beating who was convicted in the subsequent federal trial, and defending several officers in the Rampart scandal. Braun withdrew himself from representing Robert Blake at his murder trial when Blake gave a television interview against his advice. Other celebrity clients have included Roman Polanski, Roseanne Barr, Gary Busey, Chris Farley, Lane Garrison, and Dennis Rodman. Braun also represented Bhagwan Shree Ragneesh. Braun attended UCLA and UCLA Law School, and worked in the district attorney's office before becoming a solo practitioner in 1973.

Braun is known for outspoken and flippant remarks in defense of his clients, such as calling the heavy boot an officer wore while kicking King a "ballet slipper."
