= Josy Braun =

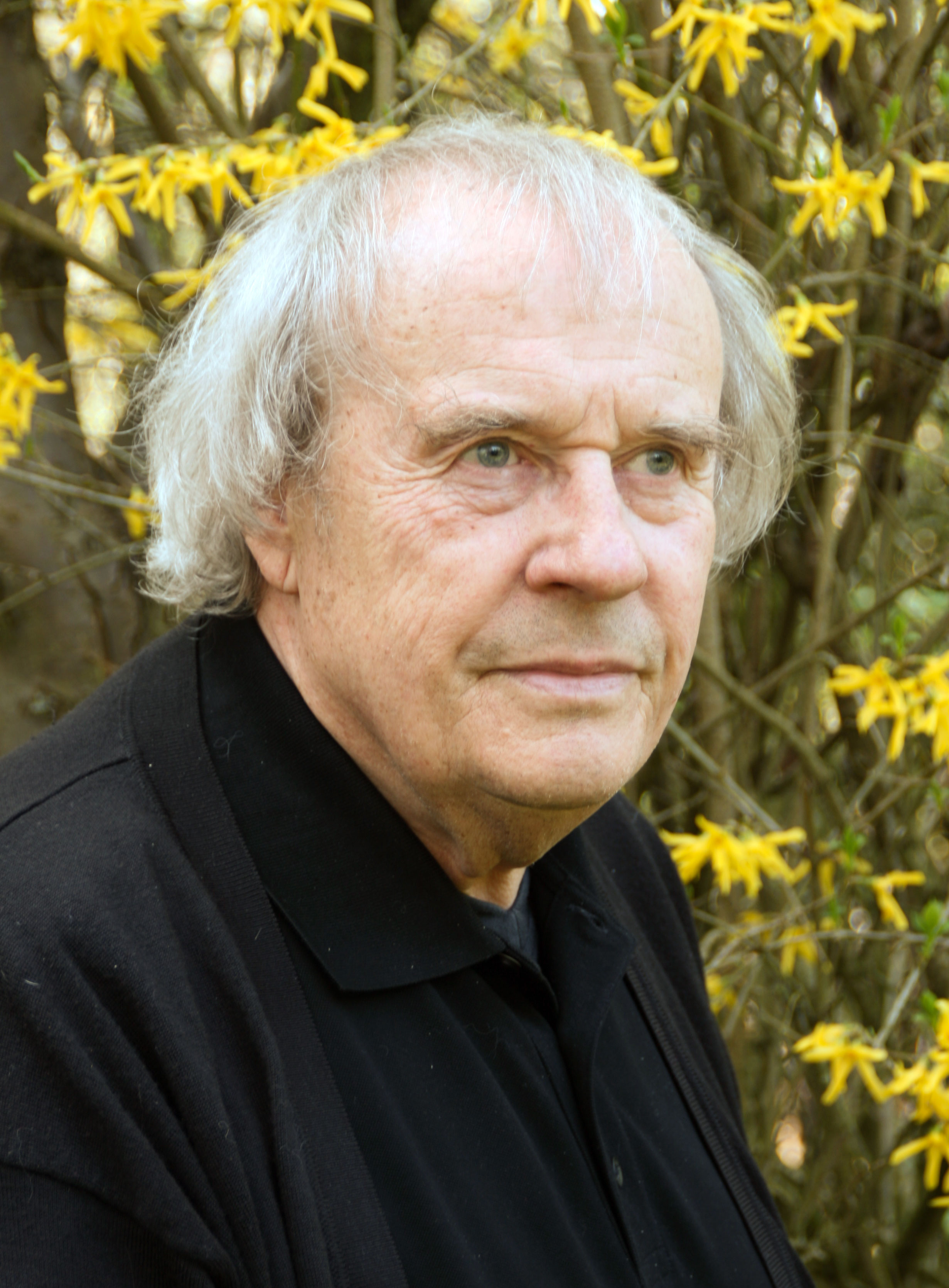
- Born: Joseph Braun; 14 January 1938
- Died: 4 August 2012 (aged 74)
- Occupations: Writer; journalist; translator
- Spouse: Josée Klinker

Josy (Joseph) Braun (14 January 1938 – 4 August 2012) was a Luxembourgish writer, journalist and translator who wrote mainly in Luxembourgish.

== Career ==
Braun wrote plays both for adults and children, poetry, prose, and children's stories. His plays, which often convey political concerns, include D'Kromm an der Heck (1966), Requiem fir e Lompekréimer (1966), Wie bas de Leo? (1976), Hexejuecht (1978). His works have been translated into German, French, English, Italian, Portuguese and Russian. He authored the very first detective story in Luxembourgish, Porto fir d'Affekoten (1997). His 2010 collection of poems, Billersproochbiller, illustrated by his wife Josée Klinker, was translated into French, German and English with the goal of extending readership beyond the local Luxembourgers.

Kréiwénkel is a novel about the dreams, longing and frustrations of its characters, showing how they evolve inwardly and outwardly in a changing world. Braun describes the village life in which they undergo slow changes in their inner conditions and spiritual experiences.

== Selected works ==
- Josée Klincker, Josy Braun: "billersproochbiller", Gedichter op lëtzebuergesch an däitsch, Editions Le Phare, Esch-sur-Alzette, 2010. 160 pp. ISBN 978-2-87964-119-5
- Josy Braun, "Kréiwénkel", Echternach, Editions Phi, 1998. ISBN 3-88865-165-4
- Josy Braun: "Porto fir d'Affekoten", Echternach, Editions Phi, 1997
