= Carlos Rodríguez Braun =

Argentine economist (born 1948)

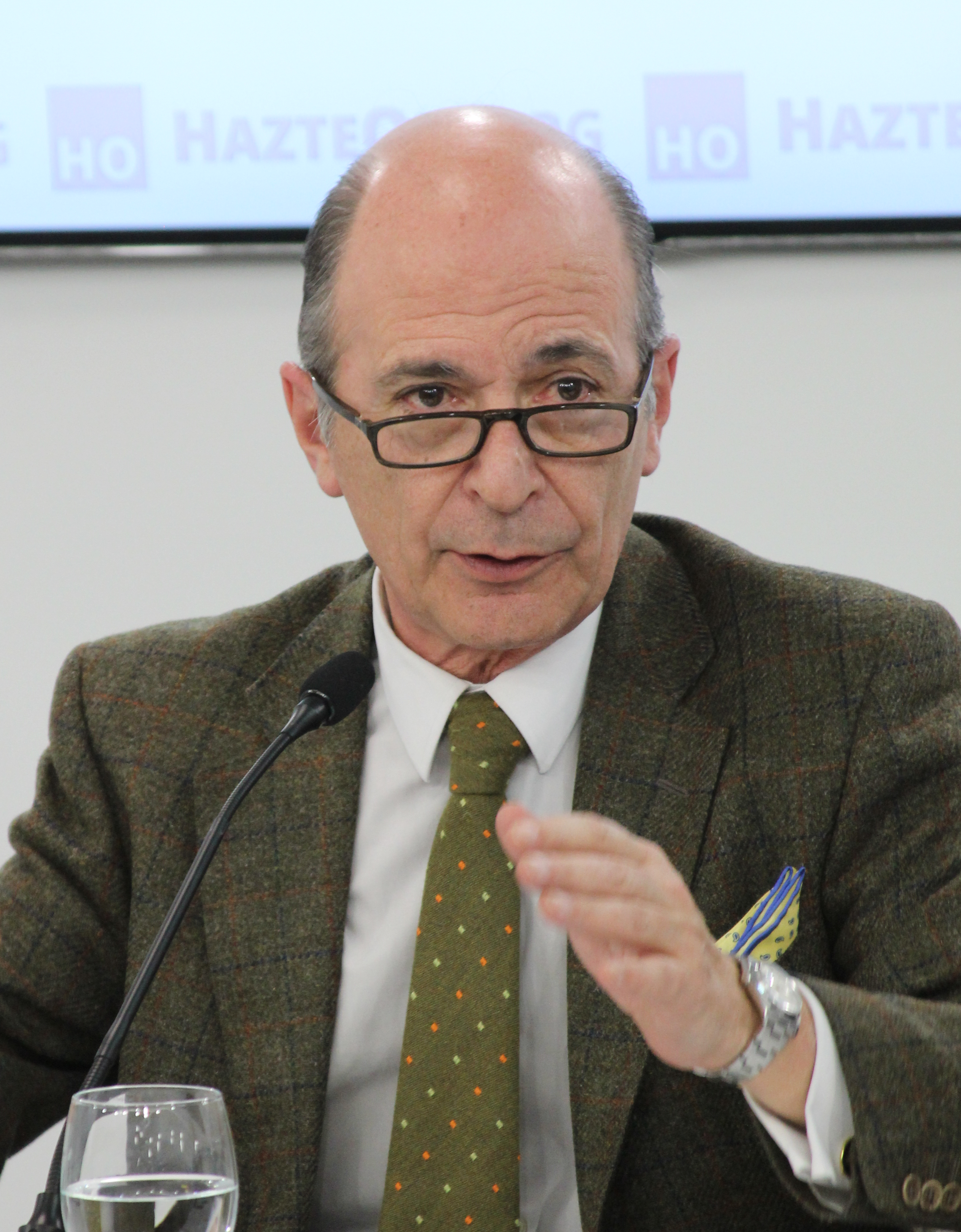
Carlos Rodríguez Braun (2015)

Carlos Rodríguez Braun (born 3 December 1948, in Buenos Aires) is professor of History of Economic Thought at the Universidad Complutense in Madrid, and is the author of more than twenty books.

A correspondent member of the Argentine Academy of Economic Sciences, he is also a member of the Mont Pèlerin Society, and has published articles in learned journals in Spain and other countries.

Rodríguez Braun is also a well-known figure in Spanish journalism: he was editor of España Económica and deputy editor of Cambio 16 and of the TV program El Valor del Dinero, and has published thousands of articles in the press. At present he is columnist of La Razón, Expansión, Actualidad Económica and Libertad Digital, and participates in Spanish radio programs in Onda Cero.

== Books ==
- La cuestión colonial y la economía clásica. De Adam Smith y Jeremy Bentham a Karl Marx, Madrid, Alianza Editorial, 1989.
- Argentina, 1946-1983. The economy ministers speak (co-edited with Guido di Tella), London, Macmillan, 1990.
- Encuentro con Karl Popper (co-edited with Pedro Schwartz and Fernando Méndez Ibisate), Madrid, Alianza Editorial, 1993.
- Grandes economistas, Madrid, Pirámide, 1997, 2nd. ed. 2006.
- La economía en sus textos (co-edited with Julio Segura), Madrid, Taurus, 1998.
- A pesar del Gobierno, Madrid, Unión Editorial, 1999.
- Estado contra mercado, Madrid, Taurus, 2000.
- 25 años del Círculo de Empresarios, Madrid, Círculo de Empresarios, 2002.
- An Eponymous Dictionary of Economics (co-edited with Julio Segura), Aldershot, Edward Elgar, 2004.
- Diccionario políticamente incorrecto, Madrid, LID Editorial Empresarial, 2004, 2nd. ed. 2005.
- Panfletos liberales, Madrid, LID Editorial Empresarial, 2005.
- Tonterías Económicas, Madrid, LID Editorial Empresarial, 2006, 3rd., ed. 2009.
- Diez ensayos liberales, Madrid, LID Editorial Empresarial, 2008.
- Una crisis y cinco errores (with Juan Ramón Rallo), Madrid, LID Editorial Empresarial, 2009.
- Panfletos liberales II, Madrid, LID Editorial Empresarial, 2010.
- Tonterías Económicas II, Madrid, LID Editorial Empresarial, 2011.
- Economía de los no economistas, Madrid, LID Editorial Empresarial, 2011.
- El liberalismo no es pecado. La economía en cinco lecciones (with Juan Ramón Rallo), Barcelona, Deusto, 2011.
- Economía para andar por casa (with O.Macías Valle, I. Rodríguez Burgos and P.P.González Vicente), Madrid, LID Editorial Empresarial, 2012.
- Clichés antiliberales (ebook), Expansión, 2013.
- Panfletos liberales III, Madrid, LID Editorial Empresarial, 2013.
- Más economía para andar por casa (with O.Macías Valle, I. Rodríguez Burgos and P.P.González Vicente), Madrid, LID Editorial Empresarial, 2014.
- Tonterías Económicas III, Madrid, LID Editorial Empresarial, 2015.
- Diez ensayos liberales II, Madrid, LID Editorial Empresarial, 2017.
- Panfletos liberales IV, Madrid, LID Editorial Empresarial, 2018
- "La cultura de la libertad. El poder transformador del liberalismo, Madrid, LID Editorial, 2024.
- "El pensamiento de Milei. Liberalismo contra estatismo, Madrid, LID Editorial, 2024.
