= Françoise Brauner =

French-Austrian pediatrician and child psychiatrist

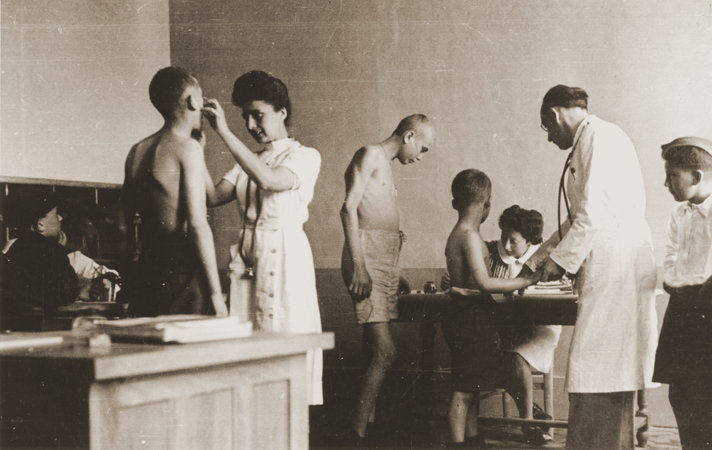
- Brauner (left) examining Buchenwald children in 1945
- Born: Fritzi Erna Riesel; 16 April 1911; Vienna, Austrian Empire
- Died: 14 September 2000 (aged 89); Paris, France
- Education: University of Vienna (MD) (1936), University of Paris (MD) (1956)
- Spouse: Alfred Brauner
- Awards: Hans-Prinzhorn Medal; International Brigades Medal
- Scientific career
- Fields: Pediatry, child and adolescent psychiatry, emergency medicine

Françoise Brauner, born Fritzi Erna Riesel (16 April 1911 - 14 September 2000) was an Austrian-born French pediatrician and child psychiatrist who was part of the medical contingent of International Brigades during the Spanish Civil War and was an Austrian Resistance member during Occupied France. She has devoted her medical career to educating refugee, displaced and maladjusted children, participating in the welcoming of Jewish child survivors of the Kristallnacht and of the Nazi concentration camps of Buchenwald and Auschwitz from 1939 to 1946 and working on autism in France since 1956. She also pioneered the analysis of children's drawings in war, creating from 1937 the first collection of drawing-testimonials to offer a unique perspective of the major conflicts of the 20th century through the eyes of children.

== Publications ==
=== Collective work ===
- (2001), (with Brauner A.), L'expression dramatique chez l'enfant : pris dans une guerre, handicapé mental (The Dramatic Expression in Children: Caught in the War, Special Need) (in French), Saint-Mandé: G.R.P.E.
- (1994), (with Brauner A.), L'accueil des enfants survivants, (The Welcoming of the Child Survivors) (in French), Saint-Mandé: G.R.P.E.
- (1991), (with Brauner A.), J'ai dessiné la guerre. Le dessin de l'enfant dans la guerre (I've Drawn the War. Children's Drawings in the War) (in French), Paris: Éditions scientifiques françaises, ISBN 2-7046-1378-8
- (1986), (with Brauner A.), L'Enfant déréel : histoire des autismes depuis les contes de fées. Fictions littéraires et réalités cliniques (History of Autism since the Fairy Tales) (in French), Toulouse: Privat, ISBN 2-7089-7426-2
- (1982), (with Brauner A.), Vivre avec un enfant autistique (Living with an Autistic Child) (in French), Paris: PUF, 2nd Ed., ISBN 2-13-037414-X
- (1978), (with Brauner A.), L'expression psychotique chez l'enfant (The Psychotic Expression in Children) (in French), Paris: PUF.
- (1978), (with Brauner A.), Vivre avec un enfant autistique (Living with an Autistic Child) (in French), Paris: PUF, ISBN 2-13-037414-X

Spanish translation: (1981), Vivir con un nino autistico, Barcelona: Paidos Iberica Ediciones S A, ISBN 978-8475091143

Italian translation: (2007), Vivere con un bambino autistico, Florence: Giunti Editore, ISBN 978-8809041141

- (1976), (with Brauner A.), Dessins d'enfants de la guerre d'Espagne (Children's Drawings of the Spanish Civil War), Saint-Mandé: G.R.P.E.

=== Academic papers (selected) ===
- (2000), (with Brauner A.), Des guerres et des enfants handicapés mentaux (Wars and Special Needs Children) (in French), Revue Européenne du Handicap Mental: p. 29-37.
- (1986), (with A. Brauner), Pictures from an exhibition, Children in War: Drawings from the Afghan Refugee Camps (in English), (Preface by Sayed B. Majrooh), Central Asian Survey, Incidental Papers Series No 5, London, Society for Central Asian Studies.
- (1986), (with A. Brauner), Children's Drawings and Nuclear War (in English), The Journal of the American Medical Association, (Vol. 256): p. 613-616
- (1985), (with A. Brauner), Les enfants déportés pendant la deuxième guerre mondiale et leurs descendants (The Deported Children during the Second World War and their Descendants) (in French), Revue de Neuropsychiatrie de l'enfance et de l'adolescence, (No 6): p. 251-259.
- (1976), (with A. Brauner) "Kindersprache ohne Verständigung" (Children's language without communication) (in German), Bibliotheca Psychiatrica, (No. 154): p. 139-144.
- (1975), (with A. Brauner) Les routes dans les fantasmes des enfants psychotiques (The roads in the fantasies of psychotic children) (in French), Confinia Psychiatrica, (Vol. 18): p. 139-145.
- (1973), (with A. Brauner and M. Pelletier), Observations sur l’expression par le modelage d’enfants dits psychopathologiques (Observations on the Expression by the Modelling of Children with Psychopathological Disorders) (in French), Expression et Signe, (Vol. 3): p. 24-48.
- (1972), (with C. Launay and A. Brauner), Les conduites thérapeutiques en présence des troubles du langage chez l’enfant (Therapeutic Management in the Presence of Language Disabilities in the Infant) (in French), Le Progrès Médical Neuro. Psychiat., (Vol. 100): p. 339-343.

== See also ==
- Childhood in War
- Österreichische Freiheitsfront
- International Brigades
- Oeuvre de Secours aux Enfants
