= Bruhn =

Bruhn is a surname. Notable people with the surname include:

- Annika Bruhn (born 1992), German swimmer
- Erik Bruhn (1928–1986), Danish choreographer
- Friedrich Wilhelm Gustav Bruhn (1853–1927), German inventor
- Johanne Bruhn (1890–1921), Norwegian actress
- Karl von Bruhn (1803–1877), German journalist
- Rolf Wallgren Bruhn (1878–1942), Canadian politician
- Siglind Bruhn (born 1951), German musicologist and concert pianist
- Declan Bruhn (born 2008), Child prodigy and youngest person to attend Harvard

== See also ==
- Bruun
