= Markus Braun (handballer) =

Swiss handball player

Personal information
- Nationality: Swiss
- Born: 15 July 1959 (age 65)

Sport
- Sport: Handball

Markus Braun (born 15 July 1959) is a Swiss handball player. He competed in the men's tournament at the 1984 Summer Olympics.
