= Antti Bruun =

Finnish ice hockey player

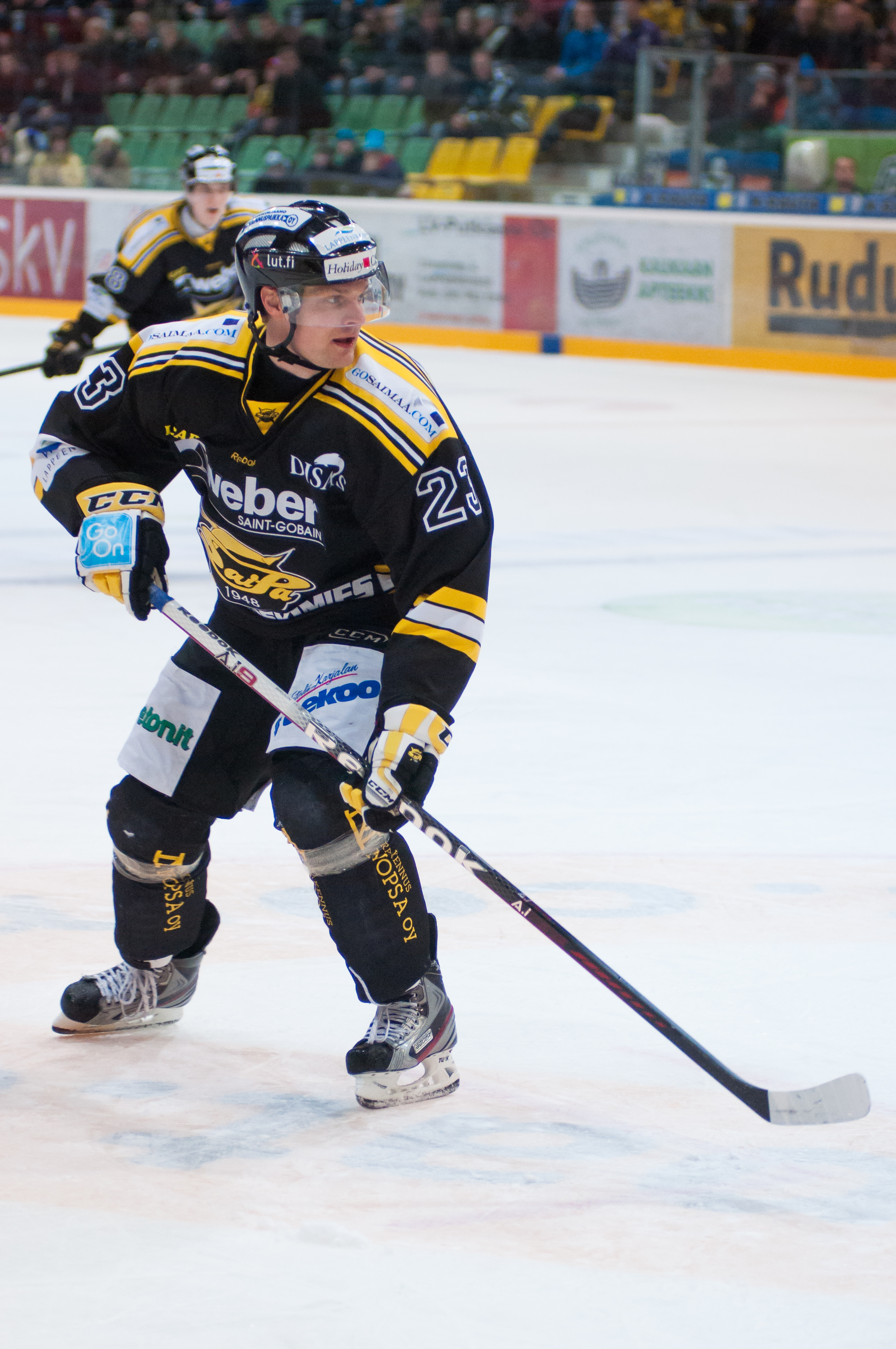
- Born: 9 November 1979 (age 46) Savonlinna, Finland
- Height: 6 ft 0 in (183 cm)
- Weight: 192 lb (87 kg; 13 st 10 lb)
- Position: Defence
- Shot: Left
- Played for: Ilves; SaiPa; Lukko; Mora IK; HKm Zvolen; HC Bolzano; HPK
- Playing career: 1997–2017

Antti Bruun (born 9 November 1979) is a Finnish former professional ice hockey defenceman.

Bruun played in the Liiga for Ilves, SaiPa, Lukko and HPK. He also played in Sweden's Elitserien for Mora IK and HockeyAllsvenskan for the Malmö Redhawks, as well as 22 games in the Slovak Extraliga for HKm Zvolen in 2009 and 22 games for HC Bolzano of Italy's Serie A in 2011.

== Career statistics ==
			Regular season					Playoffs
Season	Team	League	GP	G	A	Pts	PIM	GP	G	A	Pts	PIM
1996–97	SaPKo U20	U20 I-divisioona	12	2	2	4	14	—	—	—	—	—
1996–97	SaPKo	I-Divisioona	7	0	0	0	10	—	—	—	—	—
1997–98	SaPKo	U20 I-divisioona	9	3	2	5	16	—	—	—	—	—
1997–98	SaPKo	I-Divisioona	33	0	1	1	22	—	—	—	—	—
1998–99	SaPKo U20	U20 I-divisioona	5	1	6	7	8	—	—	—	—	—
1998–99	SaPKo	I-Divisioona	43	3	7	10	82	—	—	—	—	—
1999–00	Ilves U20	U20 SM-liiga	31	5	7	12	34	—	—	—	—	—
1999–00	Ilves	SM-liiga	11	0	1	1	2	3	0	1	1	0
2000–01	Ilves	SM-liiga	49	9	5	14	24	8	1	0	1	0
2000–01	KOOVEE	Suomi-sarja	1	0	0	0	0	—	—	—	—	—
2000–01	Kokkolan Hermes	Mestis	2	0	0	0	0	—	—	—	—	—
2001–02	Ilves	SM-liiga	56	6	16	22	53	3	0	0	0	2
2002–03	Ilves	SM-liiga	39	1	10	11	24	—	—	—	—	—
2002–03	SaiPa	SM-liiga	17	0	1	1	14	—	—	—	—	—
2003–04	SaiPa	SM-liiga	31	3	6	9	42	—	—	—	—	—
2003–04	Lukko	SM-liiga	14	0	5	5	12	4	0	0	0	0
2004–05	Lukko	SM-liiga	45	1	6	7	42	9	0	1	1	2
2005–06	Lukko	SM-liiga	49	2	13	15	24	—	—	—	—	—
2006–07	Mora IK	Elitserien	53	2	8	10	38	3	0	0	0	4
2007–08	Mora IK	Elitserien	5	0	1	1	0	—	—	—	—	—
2007–08	Malmö Redhawks	HockeyAllsvenskan	28	4	12	16	60	10	1	0	1	12
2008–09	Malmö Redhawks J20	J20 Superelit	1	0	0	0	6	—	—	—	—	—
2008–09	Malmö Redhawks	HockeyAllsvenskan	12	0	4	4	12	—	—	—	—	—
2008–09	HKM Zvolen	Slovak	22	0	2	2	10	13	1	1	2	10
2009–10	Ilves	SM-liiga	52	1	8	9	114	—	—	—	—	—
2010–11	Ilves	SM-liiga	43	7	12	19	32	6	0	3	3	4
2011–12	HC Bolzano	Italy	22	1	5	6	14	—	—	—	—	—
2011–12	SaiPa	SM-liiga	17	0	3	3	20	—	—	—	—	—
2012–13	SaiPa	SM-liiga	48	2	15	17	58	2	0	1	1	27
2013–14	HPK	Liiga	49	4	5	9	32	5	1	0	1	2
2014–15	HPK	Liiga	45	1	8	9	73	—	—	—	—	—
2015–16	LeKi	Mestis	7	1	0	1	2	—	—	—	—	—
2015–16	HPK	Liiga	35	1	3	4	44	—	—	—	—	—
2016–17	Pyry	Suomi-sarja	20	4	18	22	4	7	1	3	4	2
SM-liiga totals			600	38	117	155	610	45	3	9	12	39
