= Daniel Braun =

German author and computer scientist

- Born: 1992 (age 33–34); Saarbrücken
- Education: Saarland University; University of Aberdeen
- Alma mater: TU Munich
- Scientific career
- Fields: Natural Language Processing, Computer Science, LegalTech
- Workplaces: Marburg University
- Thesis: Automated Semantic Analysis, Legal Assessment, and Summarization of Standard Form Contracts (2021)
- Website: www.responsible-nlp.net

Daniel Braun (born 1992 in Saarbrücken) is a German computer scientist and Professor of Computer Science at Marburg University.

== Life ==
Braun was born in Saarbrücken and studied computer science at Saarland University and the University of Aberdeen. He obtained his PhD with summa cum laude from the Technical University of Munich in 2021. From 2021 to 2024, he worked as an Assistant Professor at the University of Twente. Since 2024, he is a Professor of Computer Science at Marburg University and leads the Natural Language Processing group.

== Awards ==
- 2022: KlarText – Prize for Science Communication, Dr.-Heinz-Sebiger-Prize
- 2024: Junior-Fellow of the German Informatics Society (GI)

== Bibliography ==
- Let’s Play Minecraft: Dein Redstone-Guide, 2015. ISBN 978-3-8266-9678-7
- Let's Play Minecraft: Plugins programmieren mit Java, 2015. ISBN 978-3-9584-5139-1
- Let’s Play Minecraft : Dein Praxis-Guide, 2014. ISBN 3-8266-7650-5
- Roboter programmieren mit NXT-G : für LEGO MINDSTORMS NXT, 2011. ISBN 3-8266-9096-6
- Roboter programmieren mit NXC für LEGO MINDSTORMS NXT 2nd Edition, 2010. ISBN 3-8266-9064-8
