= Jerzy Braun =

Jerzy Braun can refer to:

- Jerzy Braun (rower) (1911–1968), Polish rower
- Jerzy Braun (writer) (1901–1975), Polish writer, activist and politician
