= Reiner Braun =

German journalist

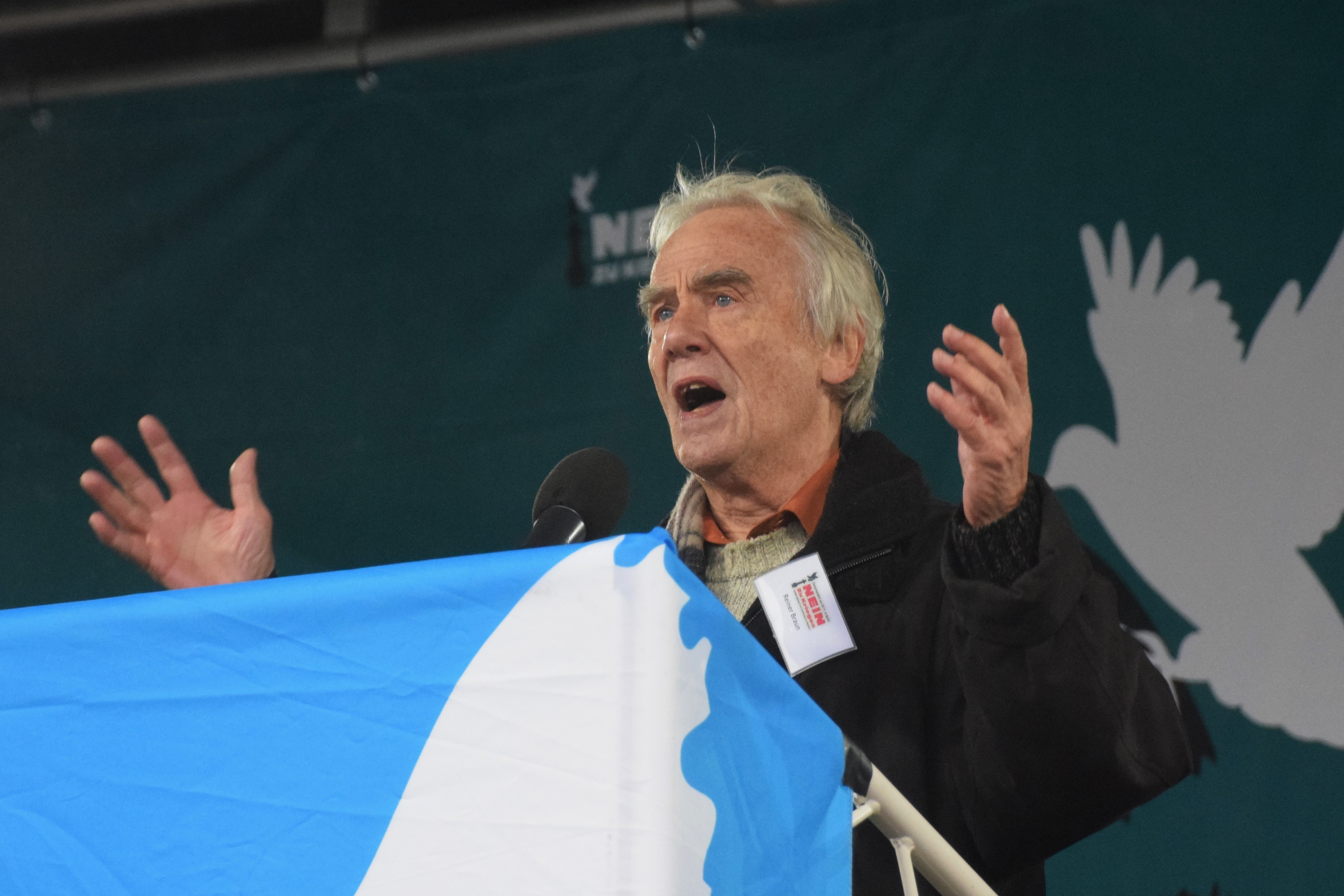
- Demonstration "No to wars" (Berlin, 2023)
- Born: December 22, 1952 (age 72)
- Occupation: Peace Activist
- Organization: International Peace Bureau

Reiner Braun (born 22 December 1952 in Braunschweig) is a German journalist, historian and peace activist. He is executive director of the International Peace Bureau (IPB). From 2013 to 2019 he served as President of the IPB.

== Activism ==
Braun has been involved in the peace movement since 1982. Confronted with the growing danger of nuclear threats he started his activism against nuclear weapons from a young age. He work for the Krefeld Appeal against nuclear weapons. He is a founding member of the International Network of Engineers and Scientists for Global Responsibility (INES) and from 2006 until 2017 he was executive director of the German section of the International Association of Lawyers against Nuclear Arms (IALANA).

== See also ==
- List of peace activists
- International Peace Bureau
