= Brown (disambiguation) =

Brown is a color.

Brown may also refer to:

== Places ==
=== Antarctica ===
- Brown Valley, Marie Byrd Land
- Brown Island (Antarctica)
- Brown Station, an Argentine Antarctic base and scientific research station

=== Australia ===
- Brown Mountain (New South Wales)
- Brown Point, South Australia

=== United States ===
- Brown, Louisiana, an unincorporated community
- Brown, Nevada, a ghost town
- Brown, Oklahoma, an unincorporated community
- Brown, West Virginia, a former unincorporated community
- Brown County (disambiguation)
- Brown Township (disambiguation)
- Brown Mountain (disambiguation)
- Brown Island (disambiguation)

=== Elsewhere ===
- Brown River (disambiguation)
- Cape Brown (Greenland)
- Brown Island or Brown Atoll, the Japanese name for Enewetak Atoll
- Browns Island (New Zealand), a small volcano off the coast of Auckland
- Brown (crater), a lunar crater

== People ==
- Brown (surname), a common surname
  - List of people with surname Brown
- Brown Bannister (born 1951), American contemporary Christian music producer and songwriter, member of the Gospel Hall of Fame
- Brown Ferguson (born 1981), Scottish football player and manager
- Brown Holmes (1907–1974), American screenwriter
- Mr Brown, code name used by Peter Macari in the 1971 Qantas bomb hoax

== Fictional characters ==
- Amber Brown, title character in a series of books by Paula Danziger
- Bingo Brown, title character in a series of books by Betsy Byars
- Buster Brown, an early 20th-century American comic strip character
- Cedric, Douglas, and Malcolm Brown, aka the Brown Brothers, in the 2016 television series Frontier
- Charlie Brown, central hero of the Peanuts cartoon by Charles Schulz
- Cleveland Brown, character on the television shows Family Guy and The Cleveland Show
- Emmett Brown, the scientist from the Back to the Future trilogy, played by Christopher Lloyd
- Encyclopedia Brown, a boy detective in a series of books
- Father Brown, Catholic priest and detective in stories by G. K. Chesterton
- Jeremy Brown, the English teacher in the British show Mind Your Language
- Lavender Brown, a student in the Harry Potter series by J. K. Rowling
- Murphy Brown, American television sitcom protagonist
- Paddington Bear, a bear in Michael Bond's children's stories, renamed Paddington Brown after being adopted by the Brown family, adults Henry and Mary and children Judith and Jonathan
- Rembrandt Brown, a musician in American television series Sliders
- Sally Brown, sister of Charlie Brown in Peanuts cartoon by Charles Schulz
- Teela Brown, in Larry Niven's Ringworld science fiction novel series
- Vanbeest Brown, pseudonym of Harry Bertram in Sir Walter Scott's novel Guy Mannering
- Agent Brown in The Matrix
- Brown, a brown bear character for the Line chatting app

== Brands and enterprises ==
- Brown, the nickname for United Parcel Service (UPS), originating from the color of its delivery trucks and uniforms
- Brown & Brown, an insurance and reinsurance company
- Brown Brothers Harriman & Co. or BBH, a private bank
- Brown Company, a defunct American pulp and paper-making company
- Brown Estate, a vineyard in St. Helena, California
- Brown Hotel (disambiguation)
- Brown Shipbuilding, a World War II American shipbuilding company

== Military ==
- USS Brown, two US Navy vessels
- Fort Brown, Texas, a former US Army post

== Music ==
- Brown (Grotus album)
- Brown (P.O.D. album)
- Brown (Chris Brown album)

== Schools and school-related topics ==
- Brown University, a private Ivy League university in Providence, Rhode Island
  - Brown Bears, athletic teams representing Brown University
  - Brown Stadium, the football and outdoor track stadium of Brown University
- Brown College (disambiguation)
- Brown High School (disambiguation)
- Brown School (disambiguation)
- Brown Field (Valparaiso University), a multi-purpose stadium

== Other uses ==
- Browning (partial cooking), the process of partially cooking the surface of meat
- Brown (racial classification)
- Brown v. Board of Education, landmark decision of the United States Supreme Court
- Satyrinae, a subfamily of butterflies commonly called the browns
- Brown (2026 TV series), an web series starring Karishma Kapoor
- Brown Line (disambiguation)

== See also ==
- Brown Building (disambiguation)
- Brown-brown, a form of powdered cocaine or heroin
- mrbrown, Singaporean blogger Lee Kin Mun
- Braun (disambiguation)
- Browne (surname)
- Brownie (disambiguation)
- Browning (disambiguation)
- Browns (disambiguation)
- Mount Brown (disambiguation)
