= Brownie =

Brownie, Browny, or brownies may refer to:

== Food ==
- Chocolate brownie, a baked good

== People ==
=== People with the given name ===
- Brownie (given name)
- Brownie Samukai, Minister of National Defence of Liberia
- Brownie Wise (1913–1992), developer of the party plan system of marketing for Tupperware

=== People with the surname ===
- Cavell Brownie, American statistician

=== Fictional characters ===
- Brownie, a fictional character in Ace Combat 7 : Skies Unknown

=== People with the nickname ===
- Clifford Brown (1930–1956), American jazz trumpeter
- Ernest Brown (dancer) (1916–2009), African-American tap dancer
- Lewis Brown (rugby league) (born 1986), New Zealand footballer
- Luke Brown (footballer, born 1992), Australian rules footballer
- Michael D. Brown, U.S. undersecretary of emergency preparedness and response
- Tim Brown (darts player) (born 1944), Australian darts player
- Vernon Brown (musician) (1907–1979), American trombonist
- Brownie Foreman (1875–1926), Major League Baseball pitcher
- Browny Igboegwu (born 1976), Nigerian actor
- Brownie Ledbetter (1932–2010), political activist
- Brownie McGhee (1915–1996), blues musician
- Agnes Vernon (1895–1948), American actress

== Arts, entertainment, and media ==
- Brownie (folklore), a legendary creature
- Brownie (guitar), a Fender Stratocaster used by Eric Clapton in the 1970s
- Brownie (sculpture), a 1905 bronze by Louis Amateis at the Houston Zoo, Texas, US
- Brownies (film), a 2004 Indonesian film by Hanung Bramantyo
- Brownies (web series), Indian American web comic
- Brownie the Elf, a mascot of the Cleveland Browns
- The Brownies, a series of publications by Palmer Cox, 1879 onwards
- Brownies (company), Japanese video game developer

== Brands and enterprises ==
- Brownie (camera), a popular inexpensive camera made by Eastman Kodak
- Bristol Brownie, a light sports airplane
- Brownie Chocolate Drink, a U.S. soft drink
- Mossberg Brownie, a pistol
- St. Louis, Brownsville and Mexico Railway, or the Brownie

== Other uses ==
- Brownie, Kentucky, a former unincorporated community now part of Central City
- Algona Brownies, a baseball team in Algona, Iowa, United States
- Brownie points, an imaginary social currency
- Brownies (Scouting), a level in several Guiding/Scouting organizations
  - Brownie, a level in Woodcraft Indians scouting for girls and boys ages 6–11
- Diplacus douglasii or brownies, a species of plant
- Miletus (butterfly) or brownies, a genus of butterflies

== See also ==
- Blondie (confection), a brownie made without chocolate
- Brownit, a mushroom
- Brown (disambiguation)
