= Brown Mountain =

Brown Mountain or Brown's Mountain may refer to:

Australia

- Brown Mountain forest, East Gippsland, Victoria
- Brown Mountain (New South Wales), mountain in the Monaro region, New South Wales
  - Brown Mountain Power Station
- Browns Mountain, small seamount near Sydney, New South Wales

USA

- Brown Mountain (Colorado), high mountain summit
- Brown Mountain (Iron County, Missouri), a summit in Missouri
- Brown Mountain (St. Francois County, Missouri), a summit in Missouri
- Brown Mountain (Schoharie County, New York), a summit in New York
- Brown Mountain, North Carolina, community
- Brown Mountain (North Carolina), low-lying ridge
  - Brown Mountain Lights
- Brown Mountain (Klamath County, Oregon)
- Brown Mountain (Tennessee), small mountain
- Brown's Mountain, South Carolina
- Browns Park, isolated mountain valley along the Green River in Colorado and Utah

Other

- "Brown Mountain", a song by the Sword from the album Used Future

== See also ==
- Mount Brown (disambiguation)
- Brown Peak (disambiguation)
