= Brown High School =

Brown High School may refer to:

- A. L. Brown High School, Kannapolis, North Carolina
- Brown County High School (Illinois), Mount Sterling, Illinois
- Brown Deer High School, Deer, Wisconsin
- Charles A. Brown High School, Charleston, South Carolina
- C. S. Brown High School, Winton, North Carolina
- Edwin Brown High School, Redmond, Oregon
- Lawson Brown High School, Port Elizabeth, South Africa
- Sturgis Brown High School, Sturgis, South Dakota
- Western Brown High School, Mount Orab, Ohio

== See also ==
- Brown School (disambiguation)
- Brown County High School (disambiguation)
- Browne High School, Phoenix, Arizona
