= Brownie (given name) =

- Gender: Unisex
- Language: English

Origin
- Meaning: Brownie; diminutive for the surname Brown or the color brown

Brownie is a given name or a hypocorism often used in reference to the brownie of Scottish folklore. The name came into use in the 1890s when poems and drawings about the mythical beings were published by Palmer Cox in the children's magazine St. Nicholas. Broonie is a variant. It was also a term for the Brownies, referring to Girl Scouts who are aged seven to ten. The term for the Girl Scouts was taken from a story about the mythological brownie. The word brownie is also a diminutive English word for someone with the surname Brown or for the color brown.

== Usage ==
The name was in rare use for both boys and girls in the United States between 1890 and 1920.

== Women with the given name ==
- Brownie Wise (née Humphrey; 1913–1992), American saleswoman credited with the success of the Tupperware company

== Women with the nickname ==
- Mary Brown Williams "Brownie" Ledbetter (1932–2010), American political

activist, social justice crusader and lobbyist

- Mildred Brown "Brownie" Schrumpf (1903–2001), American home economist, food educator, and author
- Agnes "Brownie" Vernon (1895–1948), American silent film actress

== Men with the given name ==
- Brownie Doolan (1918–2011), Australian Aboriginal tracker
- Brownie Samukai, former Liberian government official

== Men with the nickname ==
- Ernest "Brownie" Brown (1916–2009), American tap dancer and last surviving member of the Original Copasetics
- Bernard "Brownie" Carslake (1886–1941), Australian jockey
- Everett "Brownie" Carson (born 1947), American politician
- John "Brownie" Foreman (1875–1926), American professional baseball pitcher
- Brown Ifeanyi "Browny" Igboegwu (born 1976), Igbo-Nigerian actor
- Bob "Brownie" King (born 1934), American retired NASCAR driver
- Walter Brown "Brownie" McGhee (1915–1996), American folk and Piedmont blues singer and guitarist
- Huatahi Turoa Brown 'Brownie' Paki (1900–1992), New Zealand rugby league footballer
- Nau Pāraone Kawiti "Brownie" Pūriri (1924–1979), New Zealand land title officer and Māori welfare worker

== See also ==
- Brownie Mary, nickname given to Mary Jane Rathbun (1922–1999), American medical cannabis rights activist who became known for baking and distributing cannabis brownies to AIDS patients
