= Mimulus puberulus =

Mimulus puberulus is a botanical synonym of two species of plant:

- Erythranthe minor, synonym published in 1906 by Per Axel Rydberg
- Erythranthe nasuta, synonym published in 1919 by Michel Gandoger
