= Heinrich Sylvester Theodor Tiling =

Russian and American physician and naturalist (1818–1871)

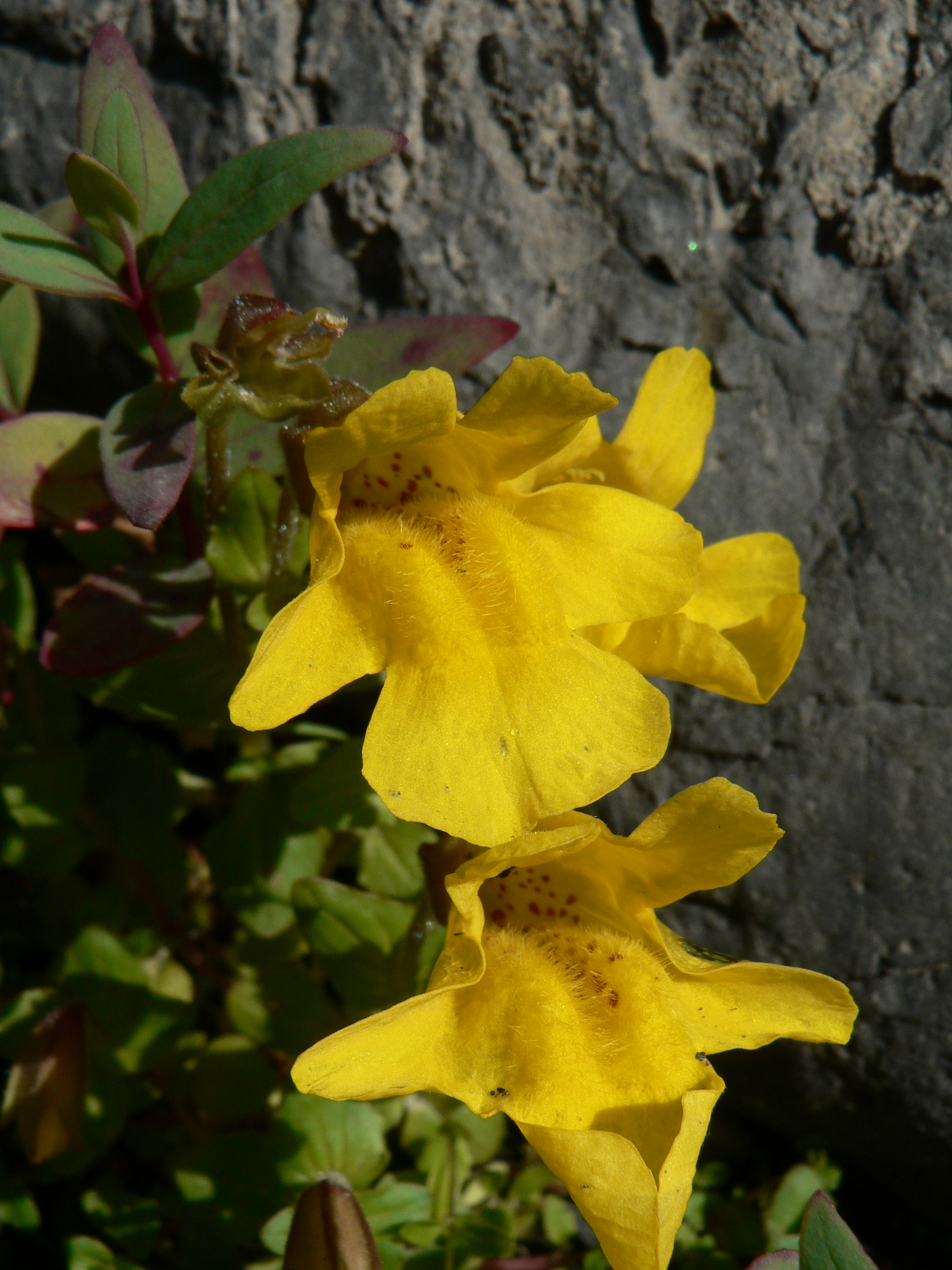
Tiling's monkeyflower, Mimulus tilingii

Heinrich Sylvester Theodor Tiling (born 31 December 1818 in Wilkenhof, Livonia, now Lemsal, Limbaži, Latvia – died 6 December 1871, Nevada City, California, USA) was a Russian and American medical doctor and naturalist.

== Early years ==
The elder child of Johann Heinrich Tiling and Johanna Margaretha von Vegesack (Pierson of Balmadis), he studied medicine in Dorpat from 1838 to 1844. He graduated and received a doctor's degree in 1844.

== Career ==
Tiling became a medical doctor at the Russian American Company in Ayan, Siberia from 1845 through 1851. He went to Ayan over land with his young wife and arrived in winter 1845. The difficulties during the overland journey were extreme in parts. He published an account of it in Eine Reise um die Welt ... see below. The German title of the book translates as: "A journey around the world from West to East through Siberia and the Pacific and Atlantic seas". During his time in Ayan, he kept a daily register of the temperature and rainfall for Ayan. He described all plants in the area and published an account of it with the director of the botanical gardens in St. Petersburg, Russia, Eduard August von Regel (Florula Ajanensis; see below). He went back to Riga with his wife and four small children and arrived early 1852.

After that, he practiced medicine in Riga from 1853 to 1854. From 1854 to 1863, he practiced in Wenden and from 1863 until 1868, in Sitka, Alaska. He had settled in Sitka before the Alaska purchase. After it he stayed and later went on to San Francisco and Nevada City, California.

He collected and described numerous plants and species in Siberia, Alaska, and California from 1844 to 1871 such as Tiling's monkeyflower, Mimulus tilingii, native to North America.

=== Journey around the world ===
Directly after having got the doctor's degree, he was offered a post with the Russian-American Company to become the company surgeon in their newly created port on the Okhotsk Sea, Ayan. He married in the spring of 1844 Anna Elisabeth Fehrmann. She accompanied him on the overland journey to Siberia. Tiling started to learn the Russian language during his travels. The journey was slow and obviously lasted longer than planned and it was already winter when they arrived. After a lot of trouble that ended very nearly deadly, they arrived in Ayan on 4 December 1844 and Tiling began his work.

At the time of his arrival, Ayan had only about 100 inhabitants and his duties as a doctor took up only about an hour per day. Thus Tiling could spend most of the day making scientific observations. One example is the temperature tables he made starting November 1847. He took temperatures three times per day, at 7 a.m., 2 p.m. and 9 pm, calculated monthly median values, and monthly high and low temperatures. He logged cloud cover, barometer readings, wind direction, and rainfall. He collected plants in the near vicinity of Ayan and according to his own conclusion "hardly missed one". His weather readings for Ayan are the oldest in Eastern Siberia. The flora of Ayan is one of the best documented in Siberia. In 1851, he and his family, now with four little children, took the boat from Ayan to Sachalin, Kamschatka, Sitka, Hawaii, Tahiti, around Cape Horn through the Atlantic Ocean back to Kronstadt.

=== Back in Europe ===
After the arrival in Europe, Tiling practised first in Riga. In 1854 he was the county surgeon for Wenden. Only when he moved to America he left this post.

=== Second journey ===
From 1863 to 1868, Tiling was surgeon in Sitka, Alaska. This was either again with the Russian-American Company, or with the Russian Government represented through the governor. Whether his wife and family accompanied him on this second journey is not entirely clear, yet it is very likely. She herself died in Riga in 1876, and also much later all their eight children. So nobody of the family stayed in the end in North America. At the time of the journey their youngest child Eduard was only six years old. Therefore, it can be assumed that at least his wife and some of the children came with him. In 1867 the US government purchased Alaska from Russia, yet Tiling stayed in Sitka. Most of the higher ranking Russian officials moved back to Europe. It is very likely that Tiling spoke English, his mother being English. His wife Anna was born in London and should have some degree of knowledge of the English language as well. There is no detailed written evidence about the later movements to San Francisco and Nevada City.

== Critical assessment ==
Very obviously the collection and categorization of plants is core to Tiling's personality. This passion is with him throughout his life. From his various places of residence he send back plants, specimens, seeds, and descriptions. Lange and Gumprecht, the two persons that reviewed Eine Reise um die Welt ...., sing his praise for the introduction and popularisation of the pretty garden shrub Weigela middendorffiana to Europe's gardens. In addition to that Regel wrote: "It is mainly Dr. Tiling to whom we owe the introduction of many excellent Siberian plants" The review of Lange and Gumprecht go far above a normal book review. They add information about Tilings voyage that is not contained in the book they review. The size of the review with 21 full pages is remarkable as well. Although Eine Reise um die Welt was published anonymously the reviewers did know the author and supported his views. At least among the German speaking people "in the know" it was clear who the author of Eine Reise um die Welt was. There must have been intensive contact between author and reviewers previously. Specifically intensive was Tilings exchange with the director of the Botanical Gardens in St Petersburg, Eduard August von Regel with whom he published Florula Ajanensis.

Trained as a medical man and having the collection of plants at his heart his interests far exceeded these two areas. One example is the meteorological observations in Ayan described above. This is probably the earliest systematic weather observations taken in Eastern Siberia. Through the scientifically trained experience of different geographical areas of the world and their resulting flora and fauna Tiling developed a very modern view of the development of nature. At the beginning of his lecture "On the inhabitants of the seas" (German: Ueber die Bewohner des Meeres), which he gave after his return from Ayan, he made people aware of the differences in the various parts of the sea and the reason for it. The Baltic Sea, on whose shore he and his audience was born and raised, he thought as very poor in diversity of species. Today that is an acknowledged fact. As the most widely known example for the extinction of species he names Steller's sea cow "… We have seen not very long ago the extinction of an animal of the sea and that in a part of the sea that seemed so vast to us that we thought it should give shelter for its harassed inhabitants."

The large variety of species and individuals in the Sea of Okhotsk near his former home Ayan was described very lively. He combined this knowledge with what he had seen on his return voyage to Europe 1851–52 as ship's surgeon from Ayan via Sakhalin, Kamchatka, Sitka, Hawaii, Tahiti, around the Cape Horn and through the Atlantic Ocean back to the baltic seaport Kronstadt, now a suburb of St. Petersburg. He drew the following conclusion: "… Add the huge numbers of sea lions, sea bears and walrusses, which you may encounter in various parts of the sea and you will have to confess that it is due to the complete annihilation of these creatures in the Baltic Sea to which we owe the deadly calmness that the view of the sea induces in us. We have so to speak only the splendid frame left of the gigantic picture that our creator has set before our eyes." With this he formulates an indeed very modern view and concern that scientists formulated distinctly during the last twenty years.

== Plants named by him ==
More than 20 species were named after him. The abbreviation Tiling indicates that Heinrich Sylvester Theodor Tiling has described this species for the first time.

Brassicaceae

- Arabis tilingii (Regel) Berkut.
- Borodinia tilingii (Regel) Berkut.
- Braya tilingii Regel
- Hesperis tilingii Kuntze
- Sisymbrium tilingii E.Fourn.
- Smelowskia tilingii (Regel) Vorosch.

Caryophyllaceae

- Silene ajanensis (Regel & Tiling) Vorosch.
- Sofianthe ajanensis (Regel & Tiling) Tzvelev
- Stellaria sibirica (Regel & Tiling) Schischk.

Compositae / Asteraceae

- Erigeron tilingii Vorosch.
- Hieracium tilingii Üksip

Convallariaceae

- Streptopus tilingii (Regel) Grey
- Streptopus ajanensis Tiling ex Maxim.

Gentianaceae

- Swertia perennis L. subsp. stenopetala (Regel & Tiling) Vorosch.
- Swertia stenopetala (Regel & Tiling) Pissjaukova

Leguminosae / Fabaceae

- Oxytropis tilingii Bunge
- Spiesia tilingii Kuntze

Ranunculaceae

- Pulsatilla ajanensis Regel & Tiling
- Thalictrum aquilegiifolium L. var. sibiricum Regel & Tiling
- Trollius ochotensis Tiling

Rosaceae

- Padus avium Mill. var. pubescens (Regel & Tiling) T.C.Ku & B.M.Barthol.
- Potentilla fragiformis Willd. var. villosa (Pall. ex Pursh) Regel & Tiling
- Potentilla nivea L. var. villosa (Pall. ex Pursh) Regel & Tiling
- Sieversia selinifolia Fisch. ex Regel & Tiling
- Sorbaria kirilowi (Regel & Tiling) Maxim.
- Spiraea kirilowii Regel & Tiling

Saxifragaceae

- Saxifraga tilingiana Regel & Tiling

Umbelliferae / Apiaceae

- Tilingia Regel & Tiling
- Tilingia ajanensis Regel & Tiling
