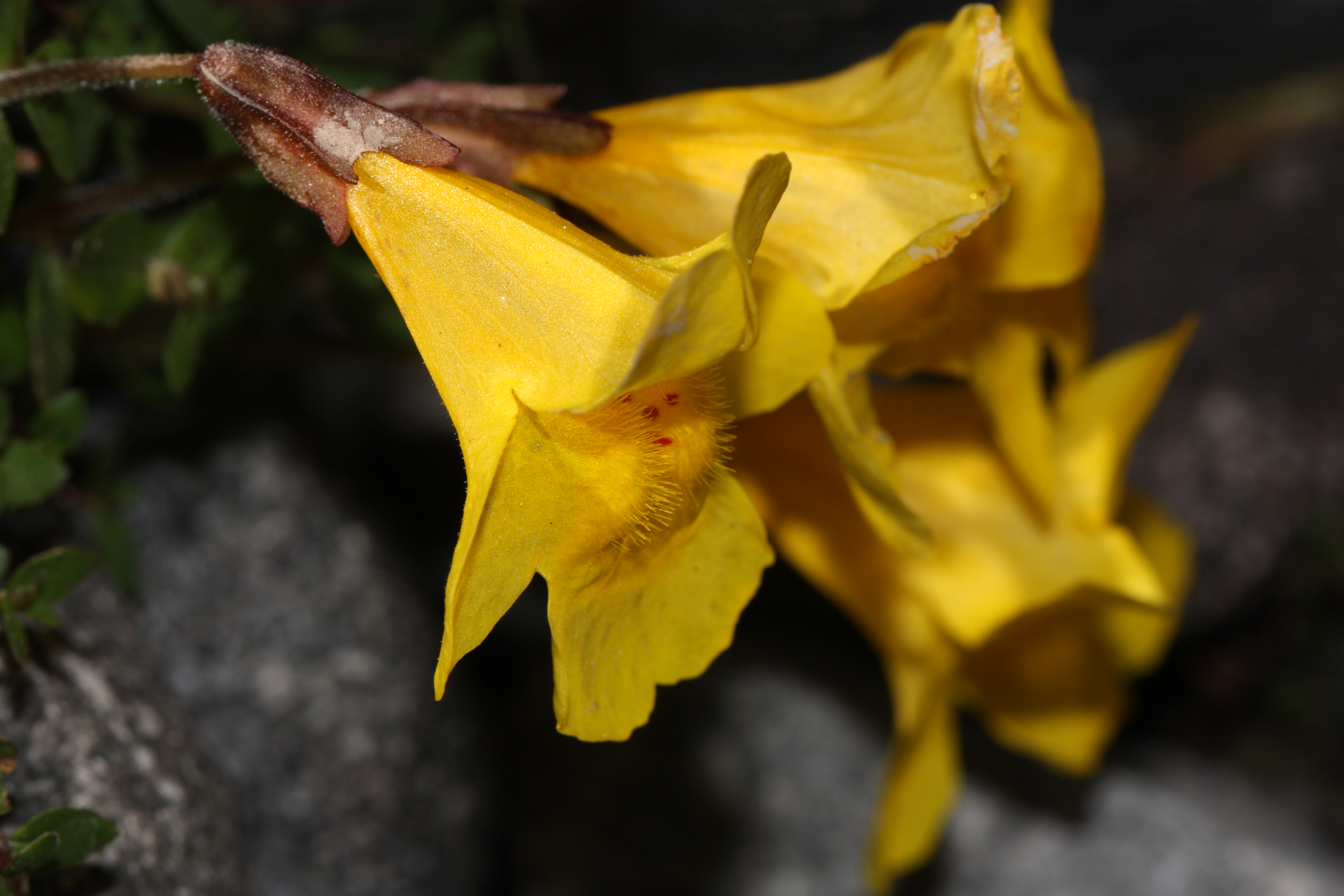

Conservation status
- Least Concern (IUCN 3.1)

- Unranked (NatureServe)

Scientific classification
- Kingdom: Plantae
- Clade: Embryophytes
- Clade: Tracheophytes
- Clade: Angiosperms
- Clade: Eudicots
- Clade: Asterids
- Order: Lamiales
- Family: Phrymaceae
- Genus: Erythranthe
- Species: E. tilingii

Binomial name
- Erythranthe tilingii (Regel) G.L.Nesom

Synonyms
- Mimulus caespitosus var. implexus (Greene) M.Peck; Mimulus implexus Greene; Mimulus implicatus Greene; Mimulus langsdorffii var. tilingii (Regel) Greene; Mimulus lucens Greene; Mimulus tilingii Regel

= Erythranthe tilingii =

Plant species in the lopseed family

Erythranthe tilingii is a species of monkeyflower known by the common name Tiling's monkeyflower. It is a perennial or rhizomatous geophyte native to the high mountains of the Western United States and Alberta. It was formerly known as Mimulus tilingii.

== Description ==
Erythranthe tilingii is a rhizomatous perennial herb growing 2 to 35 centimeters tall. The oppositely arranged oval leaves may be several centimeters long and some are borne on short petioles. The yellow flower may be over 4 centimeters long, its narrow tubular throat opening into a wide, two-lipped mouth. The base of the flower tube is encapsulated in a calyx of sepals with uneven lobes.

== Taxonomy ==
Erythranthe tilingii was scientifically described in 1869 by Eduard August von Regel and named Mimulus tilingii. It was moved to the genus Erythranthe in 2012 by Guy L. Nesom. Together with its genus it is classified in the family Phrymaceae and it has six synonyms.

Table of Synonyms
Name	Year	Rank	Notes
Mimulus caespitosus var. implexus (Greene) M.Peck	1941	variety	= het.
Mimulus implexus Greene	1895	species	= het.
Mimulus implicatus Greene	1906	species	= het.
Mimulus langsdorffii var. tilingii (Regel) Greene	1895	variety	≡ hom.
Mimulus lucens Greene	1909	species	= het.
Mimulus tilingii Regel	1869	species	≡ hom.
Notes: ≡ homotypic synonym; = heterotypic synonym

Erythranthe tilingii is often nearly impossible to distinguish from its common relative, Erythranthe guttata, as their characteristics can intergrade; one of the most notable differences is the arrangement of the flowers, which are axial in E. tilingii but in a raceme in E. guttata. By 2014 three species that were formerly part of E. tilingii had been made their own separate species: Erythranthe caespitosa, Erythranthe corallina, Erythranthe minor.

== Distribution ==
It is native to much of western North America, from Alberta to California to New Mexico to Montana. It grows in moist and wet habitats, such as streambanks and mountain meadows, and is generally found at high elevation.

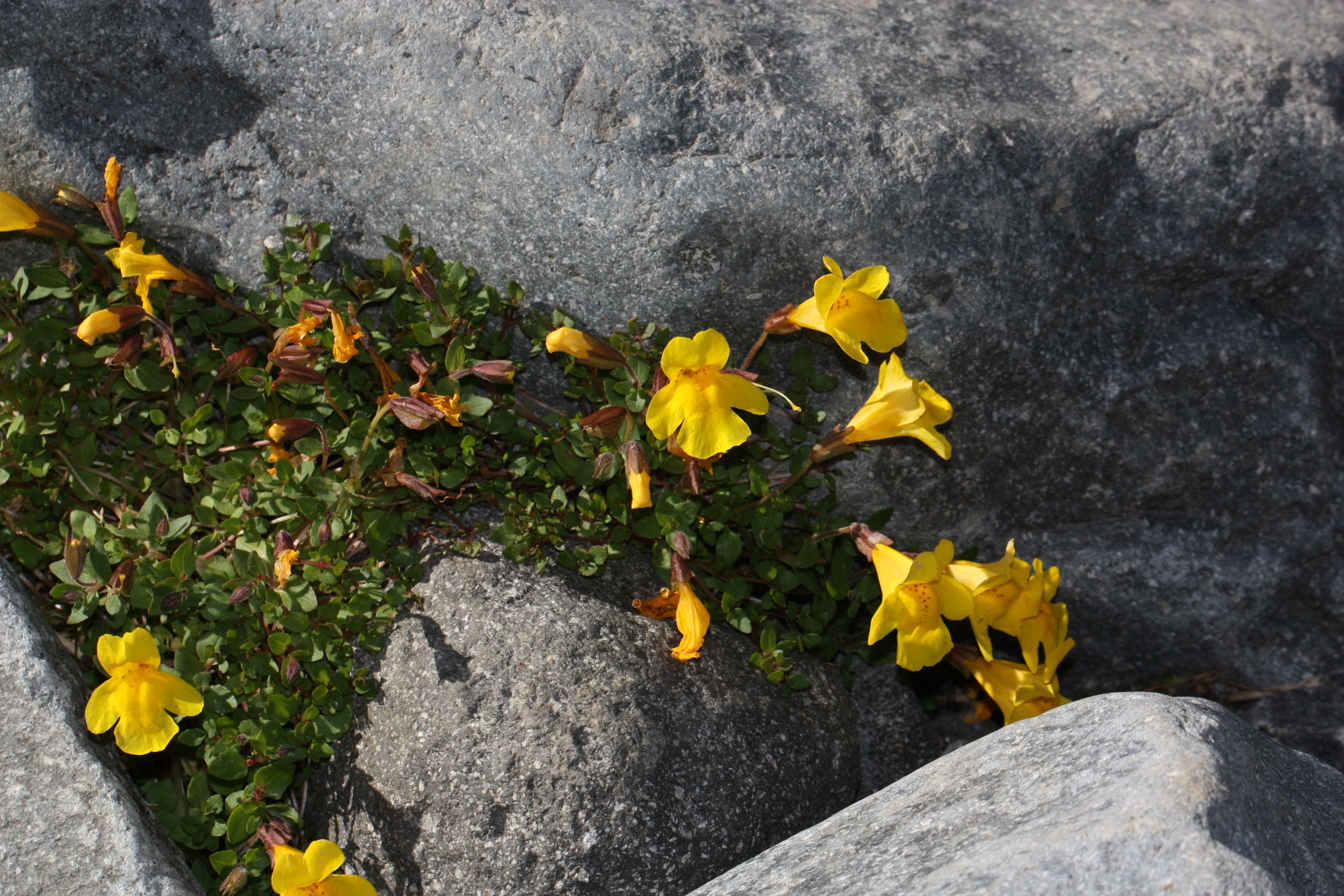
Mimulus tilingii is a mat-forming perennial herb found on rocky slopes in the subalpine and alpine zones (Mount Rainier National Park).
