= Brown River =

Brown River may refer to:

Canada

- Brown River (Québec-Maine), in Saint-Adalbert, L'Islet Regional County Municipality, Chaudière-Appalaches, Quebec
- Brown River (Gatineau River), in municipality of Kazabazua, La Vallée-de-la-Gatineau Regional County Municipality, administrative region of Outaouais, Quebec
- Peter-Brown River, in municipality of Landrienne, Quebec, MRC of Abitibi, administrative region of Abitibi-Temiscamingue, Quebec

New Zealand

- Brown River (West Coast)
- Brown River (Tasman)
- Brown River (Marlborough)

Papua New Guinea

- Brown River (Papua New Guinea)
