= Brown gold =

Brown gold may refer to:

- Coffee, a beverage made out of roasted coffee beans
- Chocolate, a drink made out of cocoa beans
- Brown coal, lignite

== See also ==
- Colored gold
- Old gold
- Chloroauric acid
- Golden brown
- Golden brown (colour)
- Brown (disambiguation)
- Gold (disambiguation)
