= Mimulus pictus =

Mimulus pictus is a botanical synonym of two species of plant:

- Diplacus pictus, synonym published in 1886 by Asa Gray, (nom. illeg.)
- Erythranthe guttata, synonym published in 1851 by Alexandre Victor Frédéric Ysabeau
