= Leonard Hill =

Leonard Hill may refer to:

- Leonard Hill (physiologist) (1866–1952), British physiologist
- Leonard Hill (politician) (fl. 1936–56), Australian politician
- Len Hill (1941–2007), Welsh cricketer, footballer and tennis player
- Leonard Hill (producer) (1947–2016), American television producer and real estate developer
- Leonard Hill (athlete) (fl. 1985–86), American distance runner, winner of the Portland Marathon in 1985 and in 1986
- Leonard Lake (1945–1985), also known as Leonard Hill, American serial killer
- Leonard Hill (New York), a mountain in Schoharie County
- Len Hill (footballer) (Leonard George Hill, 1899–1979), English professional footballer
- Len Hill (Leonard W. Hill, 1911 or 1912–1981 or 1982), British birdlover, founder of Birdland Park and Gardens

== See also ==
- Len Hill (disambiguation)
- Leonard Raven-Hill (1867–1942), English artist, illustrator and cartoonist.
- Leonards Hill, Victoria, village located in the Shire of Hepburn, Victoria, Australia
- Hill (surname)
