= Broon =

- Broon is sometimes (especially in the northern UK and in Scots) a variant spelling or pronunciation for the color brown
- Broon is also sometimes a slang term for a beer: Newcastle Brown Ale
- A comic strip, The Broons
- Broon may possibly have other meanings, see Brown (disambiguation)
- Broon is the name of an American Renaissance Faire stage show. Broon is portrayed by variety-comedian Brian Howard.
