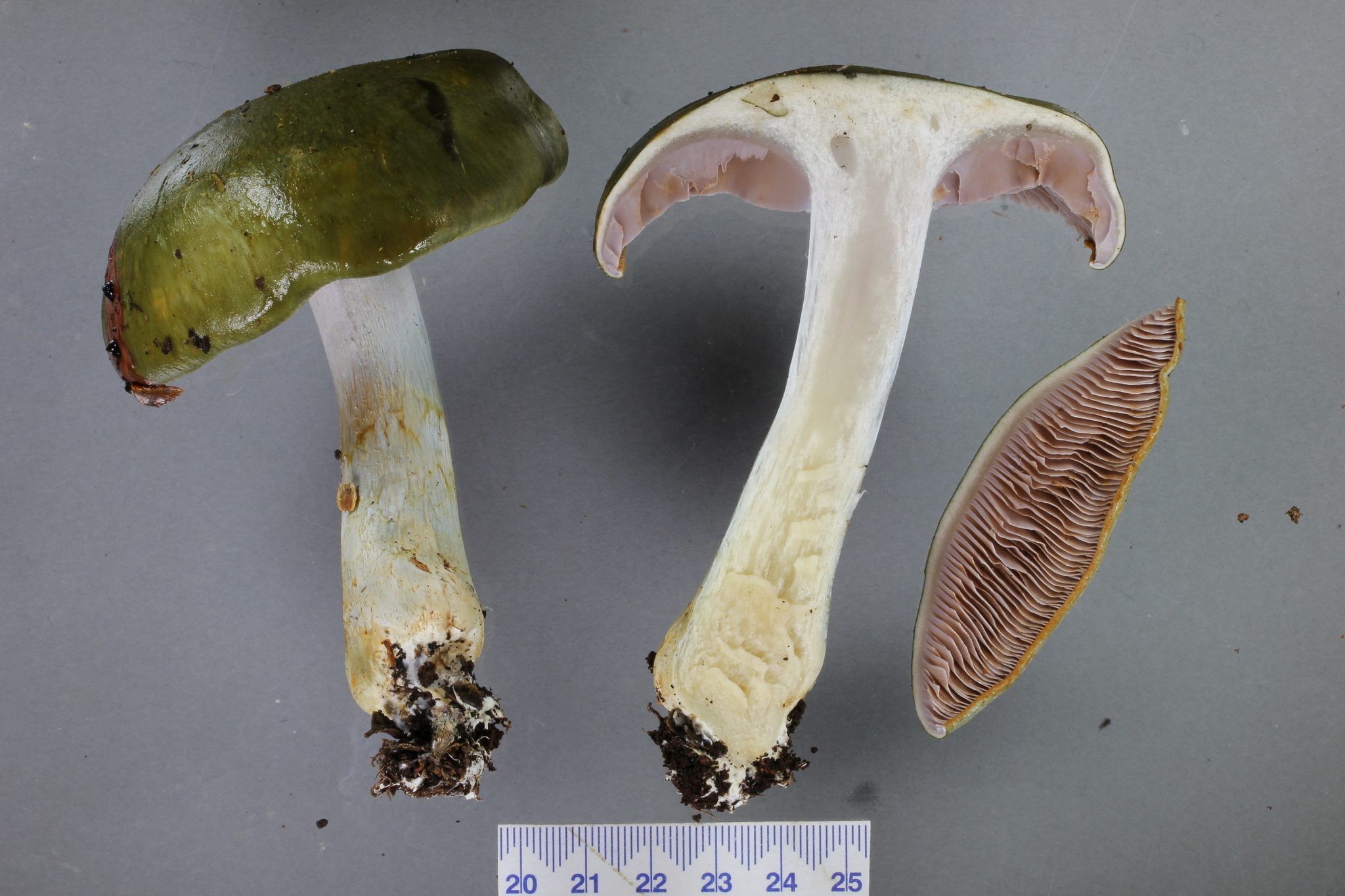
- Fruiting bodies

Scientific classification
- Kingdom: Fungi
- Division: Basidiomycota
- Class: Agaricomycetes
- Order: Agaricales
- Family: Cortinariaceae
- Genus: Cortinarius
- Species: C. viridipileatus

Binomial name
- Cortinarius viridipileatus X. Yue Wang, M.C. Te Tana, A.R. Nilsen & Orlovich

= Cortinarius viridipileatus =

Species of fungus

Cortinarius viridipileatus is a species of viscid green agaric fungus in the family Cortinariaceae. It is endemic to Aotearoa New Zealand.

== Taxonomy ==
It was described by Xinyue Wang, Mia Te Tana, Andy Nilsen and David Orlovich, with phylogenetic evidence for the placement of this species in section Delibuti of Cortinarius. The holotype specimen was collected by A. Hoeyer on 15 May 2014 on the Heaphy Track, near the Brown River, Tasman District, New Zealand, on soil under mixed Nothofagus, Kunzea, podocarp and broadleaf.

== Description ==
The pileus of Cortinarius viridipileatus ranges from 30–80 mm in diameter, initially hemispherical, becoming convex to almost plane, distinctly dark green to olive-green, occasionally with yellow-brown patches, even with pale mottling. The surface is glutinous when fresh, becoming smooth to slightly fibrillose as it dries, paler green, incurved, entire margin. The context is white, occasionally with a green hue. The lamellae are adnate to emarginate, crowded, initially mauve to lilac, becoming rusty brown as the spores mature. The stipe is 35–90 mm tall and 10–15 mm wide, slender, fibrillose, cylindrical to slightly clavate, base often bulbous, white to very pale purple, may have universal veil remnants near the apex. The cortina is yellow-brown. Spore print is rust-brown. The basidiospores are globular to subglobose, verrucose (warted). The cap surface tissue reacts to the application of the chemical solution KOH, with no reaction elsewhere.

== Habitat and distribution ==
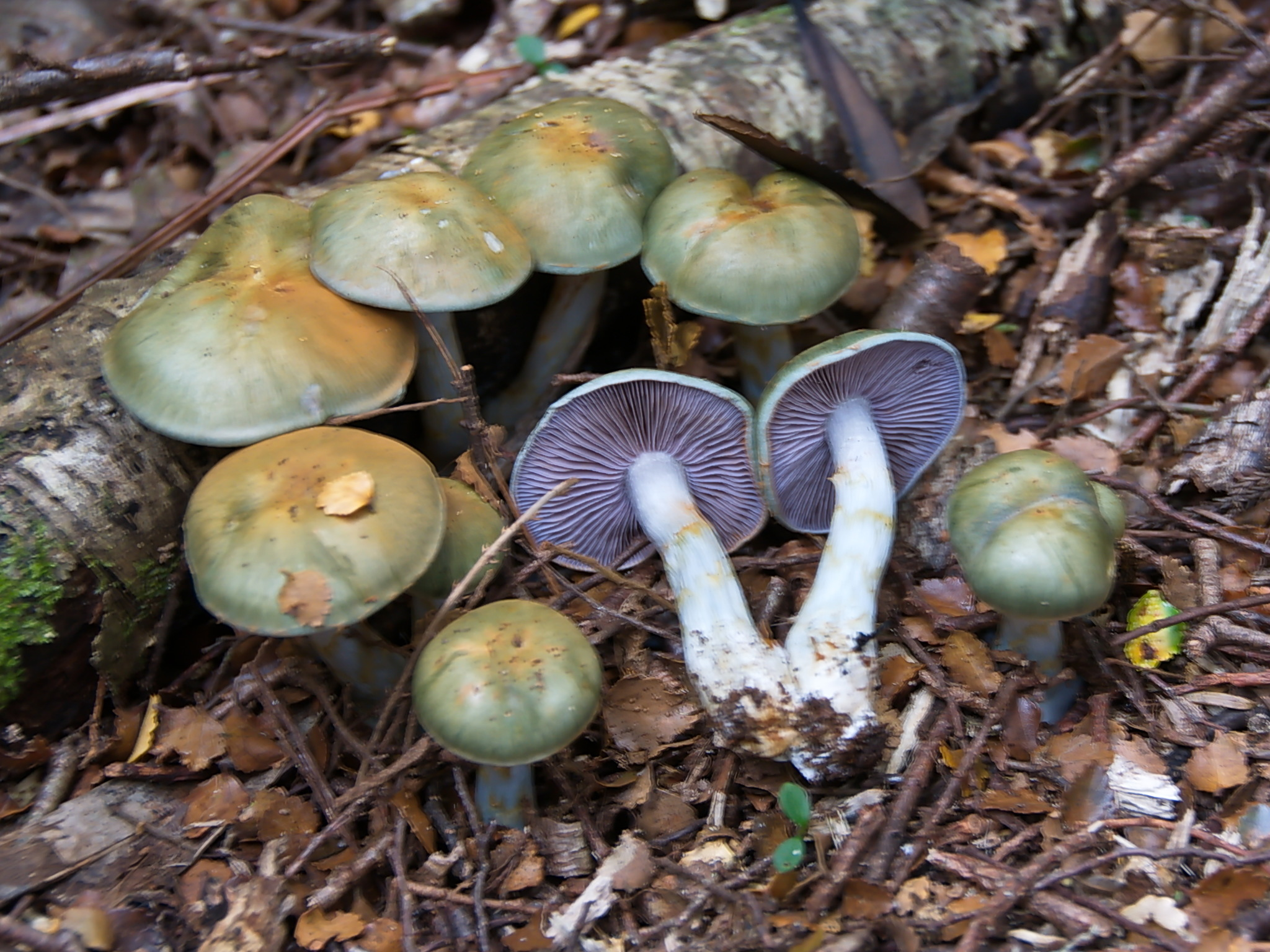
Purakauiti, New Zealand

Cortinarius viridipileatus is ectomycorrhizal with Nothofagus (southern beech) species and can also be found on the southern beech forest floor under a mix of Nothofagus and Kunzea species during the autumn months. The distribution is limited to New Zealand in the central North Island and the upper north, lower south of the South Island.

== Etymology ==
The specific epithet viridipileatus derives from the Latin viridis meaning green, and pileatus, meaning capped or having a cap, referring to its distinctive green glutinous pileus.

== See also ==
- List of Cortinarius species
