= Len Hill (disambiguation) =

Len Hill (Lenard Winston Hill, 1941–2007) was a Welsh cricketer, footballer and tennis player.

Len Hill may also refer to:

- Len Hill (footballer) (Leonard George Hill, 1899–1979), English professional footballer
- Len Hill (bowls), Welsh lawn bowler

== See also ==
- Leonard Hill (disambiguation)
- Hill (surname)
