= Brown Island =

Brown Island, Brown's Island, or Browns Island may refer to:

- Brown Island or Brown Atoll, the Japanese name for Enewetak Atoll
- Brown Island (Antarctica)
- Browns Island (New Zealand), a small volcano off the coast of Auckland
- Browns Island (California), a 595-acre (2.41 km^{2}) wetland in the San Jaoquin-Sacramento Delta
- Brown Island (Massachusetts)
- Brown Island (New York), an island on the West Canada Creek
- Brown Island (North Carolina), a barrier island located near Marine Corps Base Camp Lejeune
- Brown's Island, Virginia
- Brown Island (Washington)
- Browns Island (Washington), and island in the Columbia River, west of Wishram, Washington
- Browns Island (West Virginia), an island in the Ohio River
- Tahoramaurea Island / Browns Island, an island in the Wellington region of New Zealand
