= Safford Hill =

Mountain in New York, United States

- Location within New York Adirondack Park Location within the United States

Highest point
- Elevation: 2,247 feet (685 m)
- Coordinates: 42°28′15″N 74°22′56″W

Geography
- Location: E of North Blenheim, New York, U.S.
- Topo map: USGS Gilboa

Safford Hill is a mountain in Schoharie County, New York. It is located east of North Blenheim. Brown Mountain is located southwest and Leonard Hill is located southeast of Safford Hill.
