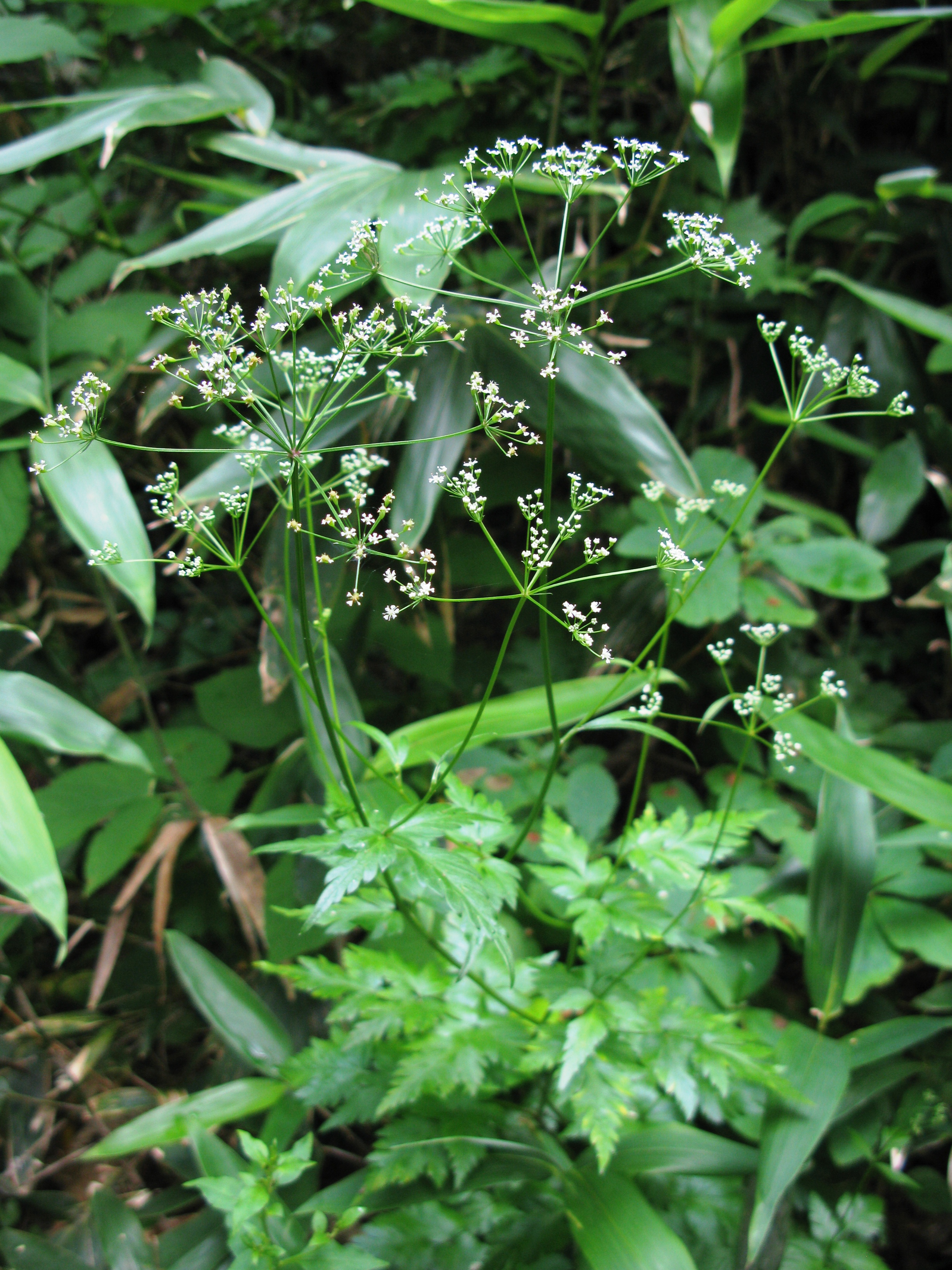
- Tilingia holopetala in Japan

Scientific classification
- Kingdom: Plantae
- Clade: Tracheophytes
- Clade: Angiosperms
- Clade: Eudicots
- Clade: Asterids
- Order: Apiales
- Family: Apiaceae
- Subfamily: Apioideae
- Genus: Tilingia; Regel & Tiling

Species
- See text.

= Tilingia =

Genus of plants

Tilingia is a plant genus belonging to the family Apiaceae. The genus was named in 1859 by Heinrich Sylvester Theodor Tiling and Eduard August von Regel.

== Species ==
As of December 2022, Plants of the World Online accepted two species:

- Tilingia ajanensis Regel & Tiling
- Tilingia holopetala (Maxim.) Kitag.
