= Hubbard Hill =

Mountain in New York, United States

- Location within New York Adirondack Park Location within the United States

Highest point
- Elevation: 2,625 feet (800 m)
- Coordinates: 42°26′56″N 74°20′38″W

Geography
- Location: ESE of North Blenheim, New York, U.S.
- Topo map: USGS Livingstonville

Hubbard Hill is a mountain in Schoharie County, New York. It is located east-southeast of North Blenheim. Leonard Hill is located northwest and High Knob is located southeast of Hubbard Hill.
