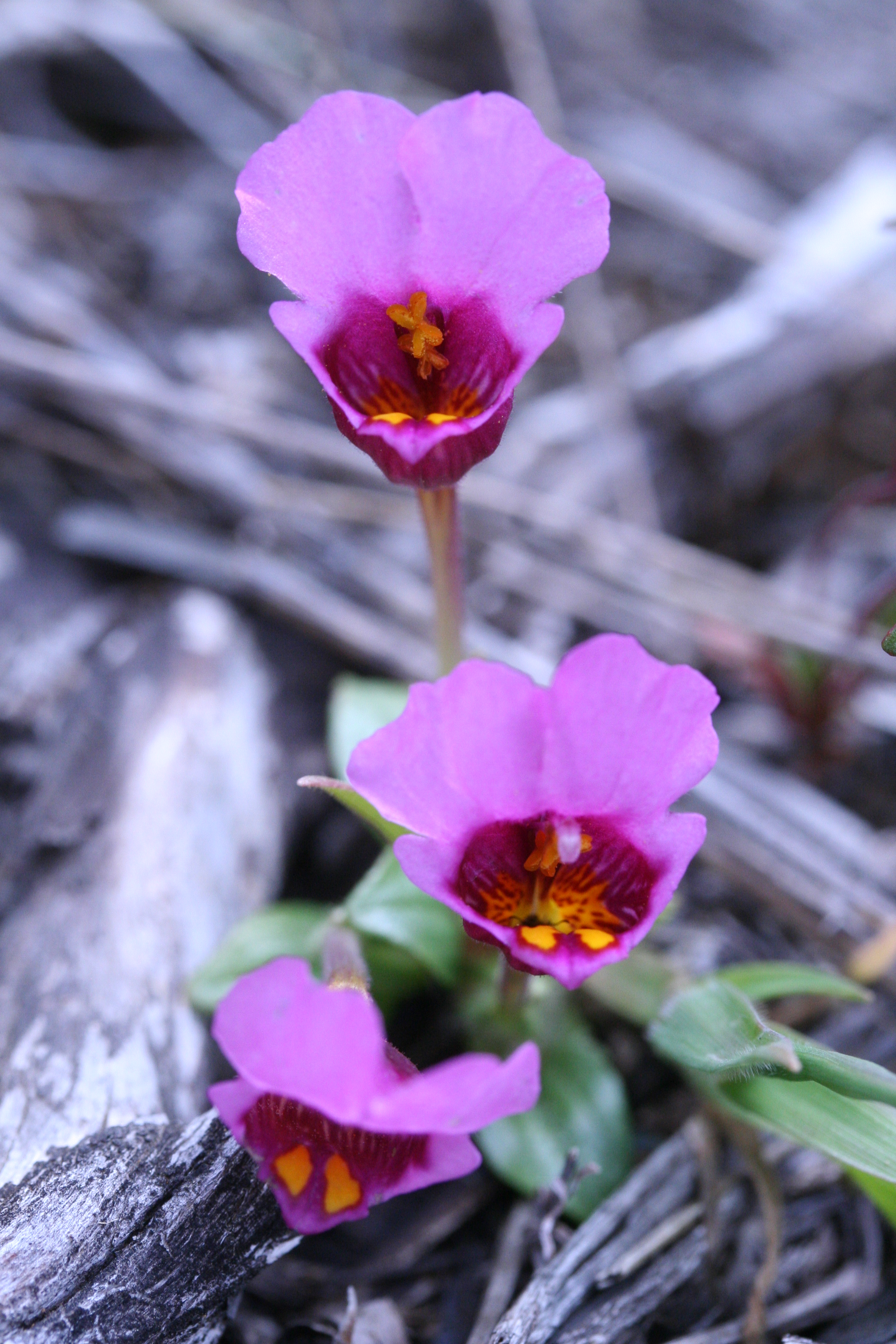

Conservation status
- Apparently Secure (NatureServe)

Scientific classification
- Kingdom: Plantae
- Clade: Embryophytes
- Clade: Tracheophytes
- Clade: Angiosperms
- Clade: Eudicots
- Clade: Asterids
- Order: Lamiales
- Family: Phrymaceae
- Genus: Diplacus
- Species: D. douglasii

Binomial name
- Diplacus douglasii (Benth.) G.L.Nesom

Synonyms
- Eunanus douglasii Benth.; Eunanus douglasii A.Gray, nom. illeg. homonym. post.; Eunanus douglasii var. parviflorus Greene; Eunanus subuniflorus (Hook. & Arn.) Greene; Mimulus atropurpureus Kellogg; Mimulus cleistogamus J.T.Howell; Mimulus douglasii (Benth.) A.Gray; Mimulus nanus var. subuniflorus Hook. & Arn.; Mimulus subuniflorus (Hook. & Arn.) Greene ex Jeps.

= Diplacus douglasii =

Species of flowering plant

Diplacus douglasii is a species of monkeyflower known by the common names brownies and purple mouse ears. It is native to the mountains and foothills of California and Oregon, where it is often found on serpentine soils. D. douglasii was first described in a published flora by George Bentham, an English botanist who was considered "the premier systematic botanist of the nineteenth century". It was later described by Asa Gray, the father of North American botany.

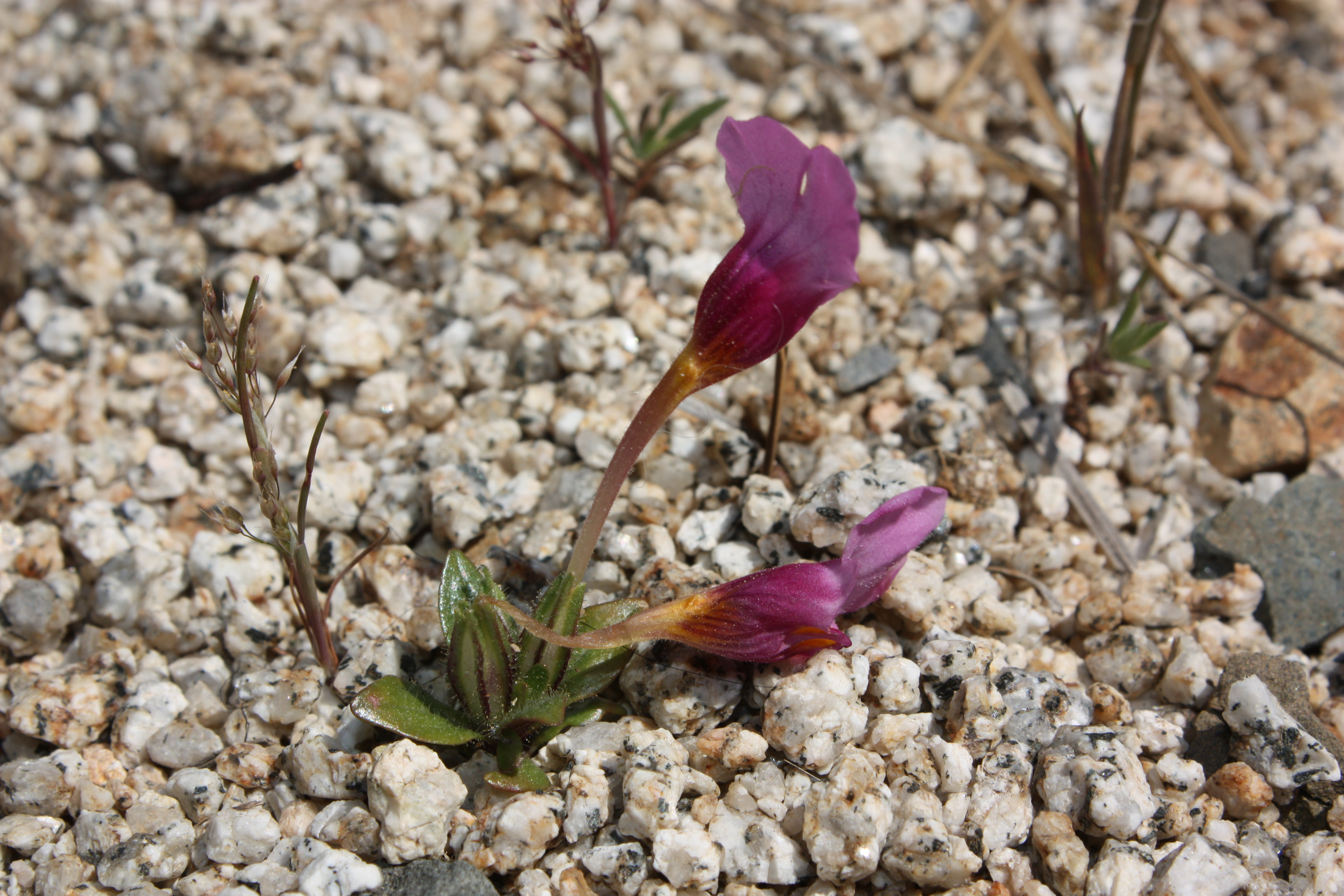
The leaf blades are 5–28 mm (0.2–1.1 in) long, ovate to obovate, and shiny green on their upper surfaces.

== Description ==
This description comes from the 2nd edition Jepson Manual: Vascular Plants of California.

Diplacus douglasii is a diminutive annual herb that produces a magenta flower. The overall stature of the plant is very small, varying in height from 0.3 – 4 centimeters tall.

Like other monkeyflowers, the flowers are bisexual and bilaterally symmetrical, with fused petals that form a tube-throat. The throat has gold and purple stripes, which form bold mottling. The tube and upper lips are magenta, and the lower lobes are so reduced that they appear absent. The flowers can be open or cleistogamous, staying closed and self-pollinating. The flower is persistent and sits atop a 2 – 4 millimeter pedicel. The calyx is generally green, hairy, and ranges in size from 8 – 14 millimeters, with unequal lobes.

The leaves are ovate to obovate blades, which range in size from 5 – 28 millimeters. The upper side of the leaves are a shiny green and are generally hairy.

The seeds are hard, asymmetrically-ovid, and range in size from 2.5 – 6.5 millimeters.

== Distribution and habitat ==
Diplacus douglasii occurs between 45 – 1200 meters elevation in the mountains and foothills of the Cascade and Sierra Nevada Ranges in California and Oregon. It is also found in Southwestern Oregon, Central Western California, and in the Warner Mountains of California

D. douglasii is classified as a serpentine indicator and hence is most commonly found serpentine soils, but can also be found on bare clay or granitic soils. As a hydrophyte, it is generally found along the upper banks of small creeks, and is classified as a facultative wetland species. However, D. douglasii is equally likely to be found in wetland and non wetland habitats, also occurring in chaparral and foothill woodland communities.

== Ecology ==
Diplacus douglasii flowers between February and April.

Growing on serpentine soils, it has adaptations to survive conditions most plants can't tolerate. Serpentine soils are known to be deficient in essential nutrients for plants. In addition to being low in essential plant nutrients such as nitrogen, calcium, phosphorus, potassium and sulfur, serpentine soils also have high levels of magnesium and heavy metals including nickel, cobalt and chromium, which are toxic to most plants.

Other plants commonly found growing alongside D. douglasii include:

Creek clematis (Clematis ligusticifolia)

Bigleaf maple (Acer macrophyllum)

Yellow monkey flower (Erythranthe guttata)

Narrowleaf willow (Salix exigua)

California wild rose (Rosa californica)

Alkali rye (Leymus triticoides)

California mugwort (Artemisia douglasiana)

White alder (Alnus rhombifolia)

California bay (Umbellularia californica)

Red fescue (Festuca rubra)

California blackberry (Rubus ursinus)

Black cottonwood (Populus balsamifera ssp. trichocarpa)

California box elder (Acer negundo var. californicum)

Columbine (Aquilegia formosa)

== Research ==
Monkeyflowers "have become model systems for the study of evolutionary processes in nature", because of their diversity in life history and morphology, varied reproduction (self-pollination to outcrossing) and ease to work with in experimental settings. They have currently sequenced the full genome for D. douglasii with 100bp paired-end at 40X coverage.

Because of its affinity for serpentine soils, studying D. douglasii presents an opportunity to better understand adaptive traits in extreme environmental conditions. Researchers have found that distinct populations of D. douglasii appear to have different environmental response thresholds for when they begin producing more cleistogamous versus open flowers. This means that different populations have varying rates of inbreeding, resource use, and ability to survive hot and dry conditions. Understanding this mechanism could give scientists insight into how plants adapt to climatic shifts of warmer and drier conditions.
