= Brown School (disambiguation) =

Brown School can refer to several schools:

- Brown School, a private K-12 school in Schenectady, New York
- The Bishop David Brown School, a comprehensive school in Woking, Surrey formerly known as Sheerwater Secondary School
- Enoch Brown School, known for the Enoch Brown School Massacre
- George R. Brown School of Engineering, at Rice University in Houston, Texas
- George Warren Brown School of Social Work, Washington University in St. Louis
- Hathaway Brown School, in Shaker Heights, Ohio
- J. Graham Brown School, a public K-12 school in Louisville, Kentucky
- Moses Brown School, Religious Society of Friends private school in Providence, Rhode Island
- Samuel Brown School, a historic building in Peabody, Massachusetts

== See also ==
- Browning School
- Brown School of Engineering (disambiguation)
- Enoch Brown School Massacre
