= Brown Peak =

Brown Peak (or Brown Peaks) may refer to:

- Brown Peak (Sturge Island), the highest point of the Balleny Islands in Antarctica
- Brown Peaks, a series of low peaks surmounting the Amundsen Glacier in Antarctica
- Rudmose Brown Peak, a peak southwest of Mount Hurley in Antarctica

== See also ==
- Brown Mountain (disambiguation)
- Mount Brown (disambiguation)
