= Leonard Hill (New York) =

Mountain in New York, United States

- Location within New York Adirondack Park Location within the United States

Highest point
- Elevation: 2,592 feet (790 m)
- Coordinates: 42°27′02″N 74°21′10″W

Geography
- Location: ESE of North Blenheim, New York, U.S.
- Topo map: USGS Livingstonville

Leonard Hill is a 2,592-foot-tall (790 m) mountain in Schoharie County, New York. It is located east-southeast of North Blenheim. Safford Hill is located northwest and Hubbard Hill is located southeast of Leonard Hill. In 1948, the Conservation Commission built an 80-foot-tall (24 m) steel fire lookout tower on the mountain. The tower ceased fire watching operations at the end of the 1988 season and was officially closed in early 1989. The tower remains on the summit, but is closed to the public. A local group is planning to restore the tower and reopen it to the public.

== History ==
In 1948, the Conservation Commission built an 80-foot-tall (24 m) Aermotor LS40 tower on the mountain. The tower was previously standing at Gilbert Lake State Park from 1932 until it was dismantled and moved. Due to the increased use of aerial detection, the tower ceased fire watching operations at the end of the 1988 season. In early 1989, the tower was officially closed by the New York State Department of Environmental Conservation. The tower remains on the summit, but is closed to the public. Recently a local group has begun plans to restore the tower.
