= Samuel Brown School =

- U.S. National Register of Historic Places
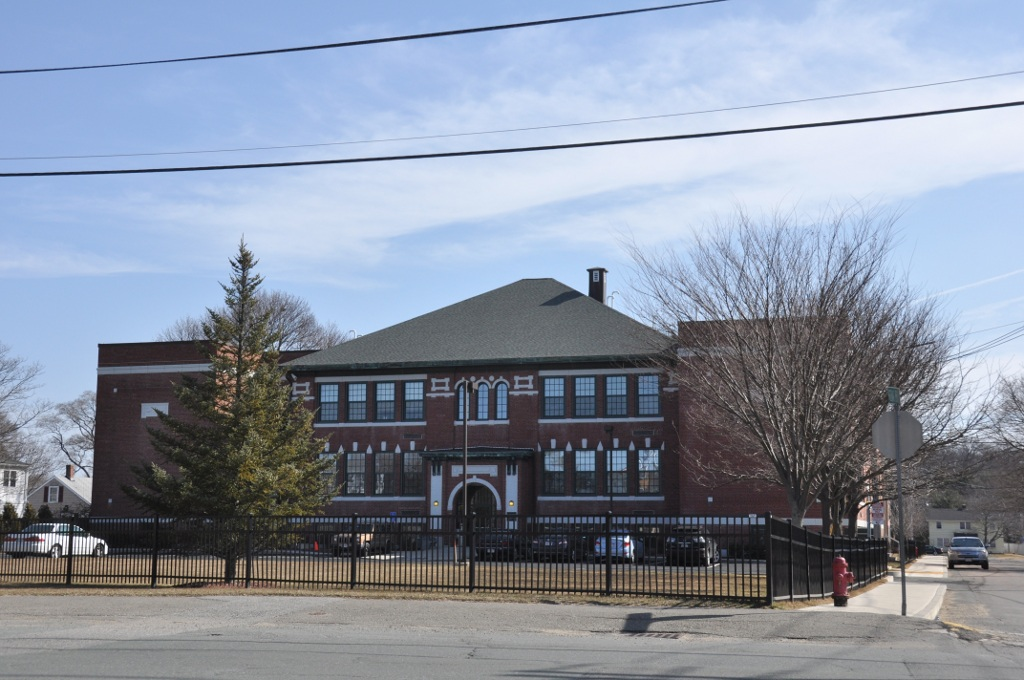

- Location within Massachusetts Location within the United States
- Location: 200 Lynn St., Peabody, Massachusetts
- Coordinates: 42°30′13″N 70°57′4″W
- Area: 1.3 acres (0.53 ha)
- Built: 1911
- Built by: John D. Jeffers
- Architect: Edwin Earp & Son; John M. Gray Company
- Architectural style: Classical Revival
- NRHP reference No.: 09000611
- Added to NRHP: August 12, 2009

The Samuel Brown School is a historic school building at 200 Lynn St. in Peabody, Massachusetts.

The building was listed on the National Register of Historic Places on August 12, 2009.

== History ==
Negotiations for the school's construction began in 1911 with the appointment of a four-man building committee: Dr. John F. Jordan, James J. Sheehan, Henry W. Shaw and T.W. Reilly. The city acquired the property where the school sits from Augusta B. Trask and Eliza E. Manning. The contractor for the project, John D. Jeffers of Peabody, submitted the lowest bid of $29,135.80. Ground was broken for the school in May 1911 and work on the building commenced the following month. The building was situated 150 feet from Lynn Street and surrounded by a pipe railing.

The city's oldest existing school was designed by architect Edwin Earp & Son of Lynn, who later sued the town for $3000 for fees in connection with the drawing of plans for the school. The town expended $33,000 for the building committee and for architect's fees. It took about three months to complete the building that was finished on September 20, 1911. The school's one hundred pupils then occupied three rooms. The building was named for Samuel Brown, who died during the American Civil War in the Battle of Antietam.

The original school building was enlarged in 1920 to a ten-room building. Four more rooms were added in 1950. Both of these additions were designed by John M. Gray, who served as the town's de facto municipal architect.

In addition to the school's namesake, the library was named in the 1960s in memory of former Brown School teacher and librarian Nancy D'Allasandro.

Principals of the Samuel Brown School: 1912-18 (?), 1918–52, Annie I. McCarthy, 1952-? Edward J. O'Connor, Louis Surman, George "Ernie" Osborne.

The building was converted for use as senior housing in 2008.

== See also ==
- National Register of Historic Places listings in Essex County, Massachusetts
