= Brown Mountain (Tennessee) =

Small mountain

Highest point
- Elevation: 1,260 ft (380 m)
- Coordinates: 35.8172916°N 84.9341175°W

Geography
- Location: Cumberland County, Tennessee, U.S.A.
- Topo map: Brown Mountain topo map

Brown Mountain is a mountain in Cumberland County, Tennessee, United States, west of Knoxville and north of Chattanooga.

It is named after Absolom Biloat Brown, who carved his name into the wall of Hubbard's Cave on Brown Mountain before the nearby town of Beersheba Springs was founded.

Its summit is at an elevation of 1,260 feet (380 meters) above sea level, making it the 1,095th highest mountain in the state. Nearby peaks include Buzard Hill, Wise Hill, High Point, Betsy Mountain, Johnson Mountain, and Nichols Mountain.

== See also ==
- Crab Orchard Mountains
