= Brown Island (North Carolina) =

Barrier island in North Carolina, United States

- Location within North Carolina

Geography
- Coordinates: 34°40′06″N 77°21′35″W

Administration
- U.S.
- County: Onslow County, North Carolina

Brown Island is a barrier island in Onslow County, North Carolina. It is owned by the United States Department of Defense and ruled by Marine Corps Base Camp Lejeune. Since the 1940s, the USMC has used the island for live-fire training exercises with unexploded ordnance. No unauthorized people are allowed on any part of the island. Boaters traversing the Intracoastal Waterway in close proximity to the island may not stop, tie up or disembark their vessels.
