= USS Brown =

USS Brown may refer to the following ships of the United States Navy:

- USS Brown (SP-1050), a minesweeping tugboat acquired in 1917 and sunk in 1920
- USS Brown (DD-546), a Fletcher-class destroyer in service from 1943 to 1962
