= Brown County High School =

Brown County High School may refer to

- Brown County High School (Illinois)
- Brown County High School (Indiana)
