= Browns Mountain =

Submarine mountain off the coast of Australia

- Location within Australia
- Summit depth: 480 m (1,570 ft)
- Height: 133 m (436 ft)

Location
- Location: South-west Pacific Ocean, near Australia
- Coordinates: 34°01′51″S 151°40′14″E
- Country: Australia

Browns Mountain, also sometimes spelt Brown's Mountain, is a small submarine mountain – a seamount – lying in the south-western Pacific Ocean 38 km off the coast of New South Wales, Australia, about 50 km east of the city of Sydney. The waters around the seamount are about 600 m in depth, while the mountain itself rises some 133 m above the sea floor. It is a popular site for commercial and recreational fishing.

It got its name from Ernie Brown, the popular local Sydney fisherman who discovered it.
