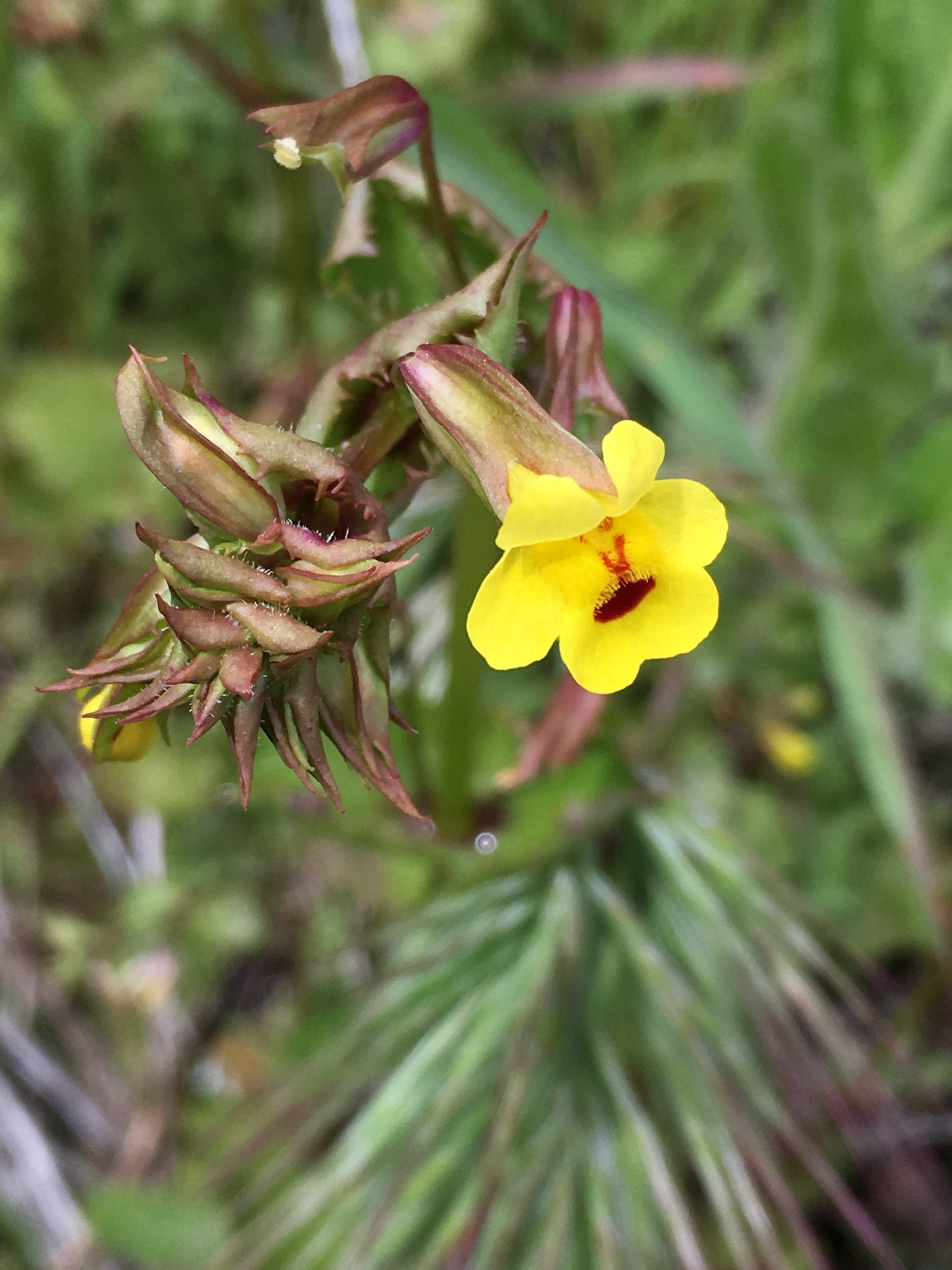
- San Diego County, California, 2019

Conservation status
- Apparently Secure (NatureServe)

Scientific classification
- Kingdom: Plantae
- Clade: Embryophytes
- Clade: Tracheophytes
- Clade: Angiosperms
- Clade: Eudicots
- Clade: Asterids
- Order: Lamiales
- Family: Phrymaceae
- Genus: Erythranthe
- Species: E. nasuta

Binomial name
- Erythranthe nasuta (Greene) G.L.Nesom

Synonyms
- List: Mimulus guttatus var. nasutus (Greene) Jeps.; Mimulus langsdorffii var. nasutus (Greene) Jeps.; Mimulus nasutus Greene; Mimulus bakeri Gand.; Mimulus cuspidatus Greene; Mimulus erosus Greene; Mimulus guttatus var. gracilis (A.Gray) G.R.Campb.; Mimulus luteus var. gracilis A.Gray, W.H.Emory; Mimulus parishii Gand.; Mimulus puberulus Gand.; Mimulus puncticalyx Gand.; Mimulus sookensis B.G.Benedict, Modlisz., Sweigart, N.H.Martin, Ganders & John; Mimulus subreniformis Greene

= Erythranthe nasuta =

Species of flowering plant

Erythranthe nasuta, also known as shy monkeyflower, is a species of monkeyflower. It was formerly known as Mimulus nasutus. It is an annual native to western North America, ranging from British Columbia to northwestern Mexico.

Erythranthe nasuta evolved from Erythranthe guttata in central California between 200,000 and 500,000 years ago and since then has become primarily a self-pollinator. Other differences have occurred since then, such as genetic code variations and variations in plant morphology. E. nasuta prefers a drier habitat than E. guttata.
