= Brown Mountain (Schoharie County, New York) =

Mountain in New York, United States

- Location within New York Adirondack Park Location within the United States

Highest point
- Elevation: 2,041 feet (622 m)
- Coordinates: 42°27′18″N 74°25′10″W

Geography
- Location: SE of North Blenheim, New York, U.S.
- Topo map: USGS Gilboa

Brown Mountain is a mountain in Schoharie County, New York. It is located southeast of North Blenheim. Reed Hill is located southwest and Safford Hill is located northeast of Brown Mountain.
