= Brown Hotel (disambiguation) =

The Brown Hotel is a hotel in Louisville, Kentucky.

The Brown Hotel or Brown's Hotel may also refer to:

- Brown's Hotel, London, England
- Brown's Hotel, Laugharne, in Carmarthenshire, Wales
- Brown Hotel (Neodesha, Kansas)
- Brown Hotel and Cafe, in Denham Springs, Louisiana
- Brown's Hotel (Catskills), in New York
- Hotel Brown, in Flasher, North Dakota
