= Brown Building =

Brown Building may refer to:

in the United States

- Brown Building (Wichita, Kansas), listed on the NRHP in Sedgwick County, Kansas
- Brown Building (Manhattan), site of the Triangle Shirtwaist Factory fire
- Brown Building (Austin, Texas), listed on the NRHP in Texas
- Brown Building (Morgantown, West Virginia), listed on the NRHP in Monongalia County, West Virginia
