= Charles A. Brown High School =

High school in Charleston, South Carolina, US

Coordinates: 32.7979°N 79.9362°W

Charles A. Brown High School (a.k.a. C. A. Brown High School) was a high school open from 1962 to 1982 in the predominantly African-American community on the east side of Charleston, South Carolina, United States. The school was built because of the growing population in the downtown community It was located at 25 Blake Street and became part of a 1960s project to provide higher quality education to African American students.

== History ==
The school and was originally named Eastside High School. Its first day of classes was on September 4, 1962. It was renamed Charles A. Brown High School after the death of Charleston School Board Trustee Chairman Charles Albert Brown, who led the creation, design and building of the school. In 1962, the fighting panther was chosen as the school mascot and in 1963, Hedy Brown wrote the Alma Mater "Dear C. A. Brown”, sung to the tune of Londonderry Air (O Danny Boy). The school was integrated in 1970 and included students from surrounding neighborhoods, as well as a few white students.

The school closed in 1982 and students in the surrounding area were sent to Charleston High School and Burke High School instead. The school facility was purchased in 1986 by the Trident Technical College for its Palmer Campus, which focused on culinary arts.

== Staff ==
The school principals were Nathaniel L. Manigualt, George D. Stanyard, and John G. Singletary. US House of Representative Leader James Clyburn was at one time on its staff. Well-known artist Dorothy Wright also taught there, as did band leader George Kenny.
