= Brown Mountain (Iron County, Missouri) =

Mountain in Missouri, United States of America

Coordinates: 37°34′14″N 90°32′45″W

Brown Mountain is a summit in Iron County in the U.S. state of Missouri. The peak is at an elevation of 1,388 feet (423 m).

Brown Mountain has the name of the local Brown family.
