= Brown, Nevada =

- Ghost town
- Location within Nevada Location within the United States
- Coordinates: 37°36′26″N 114°07′58″W
- Country: United States
- State: Nevada
- County: Lincoln
- Elevation: 5,784 ft (1,763 m)

Brown is an extinct settlement and former railroad siding in Lincoln County, in the U.S. state of Nevada.

== History ==
The first settlement at Brown was made in 1905. In 1941 it was reported that Brown had a population of 10.
