= Lawson Brown High School =

School in South Africa

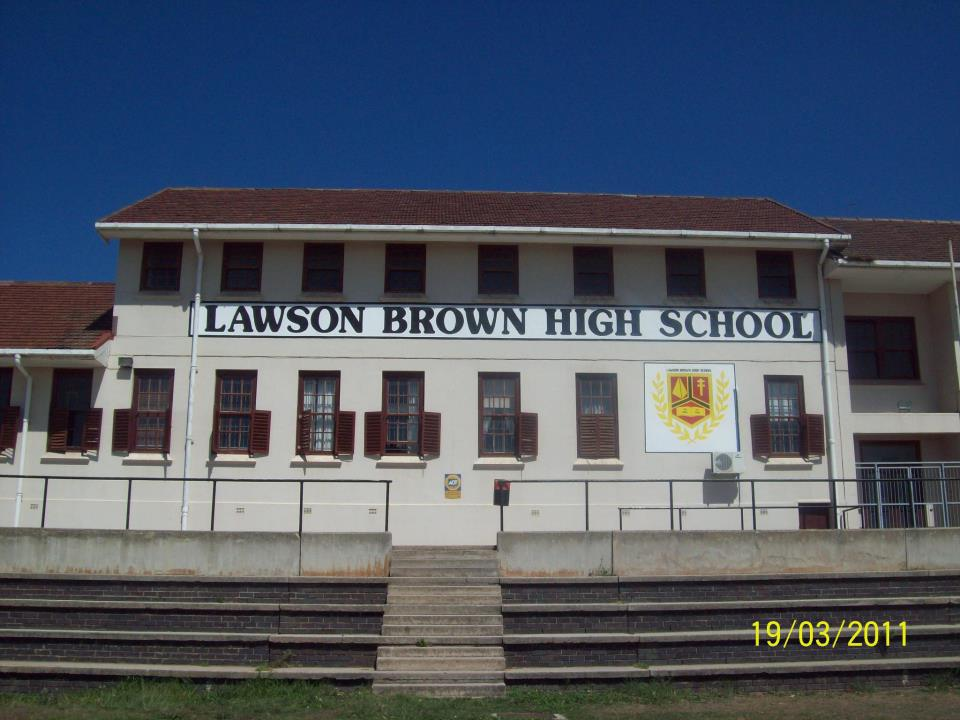
Lawson Brown High School

Lawson Brown High School is a public secondary school situated in Millard Grange, Port Elizabeth, South Africa. The school educates children from Grades 8 to 12.

== History ==
Lawson Brown is an English-medium co-educational high school that caters for Grade 8 – Grade 12 learners. The school’s existence resulted from the splitting of the dual-medium Lawson Brown High School, founded in 1938 in Sidwell. The school was named after city councillor W Lawson Brown, a prominent lawyer and chairman of the Port Elizabeth School Board.

In 1953, the Sidwell school was divided, and the English-speaking component moved to the Mount Road area now known as Millard Grange, with the new school known as Mount Road High School initially. The Afrikaans-speaking component of the school remained on the original site and became known as Hoerskool Cillie. Mount Road High School was later renamed after Mr W. Lawson Brown – a prominent lawyer, City Councilor and Chairman of the then School Board who had laid the foundation stone of the original building. In 1953, Principal MR J.A. Campbell and three staff taught 1098 Std 7’s (now Grade 9) in a cluster of pre-fabs and by 1955, when the new building was completed the enrollment had grown to 320.

The hall, which for many years served as the venue for the Inter-Schools’ Play Festival, was erected shortly before the retirement of second principal Mr C.F. de Lange. He was succeeded briefly by Mr. D.H. Schroeder who later distinguished himself on both the SATA and RFC executives. With Mr M.E. Yates, later Chief Superintendent of Education, at the helm, enrollment reached nearly 750, which made this the largest “white” school in those years. It was also in this time that Lawson Brown’s Art Centre, for which the school has become famous, was established.

When part of the school's traditional feeder area changed from residential to industrial, principal B.F. Simpson opened the school to pupils of all races and persuasions, thus pioneering among state-controlled schools in this city an integrated system of education in the very spirit of the words of Mr Adcock 50 years earlier and just as in the spirit of the New South Africa.

=== Buildings ===
The opening on 22 June 1929 of the new Paterson Secondary School, off Mount Road, by the Superintendent-General of Education, Dr. W.J.Viljoen. The architect was Ernest Stevenson. When the new Paterson High in Korsten and the second High School in New Brighton were completed, the pupils left Mount Road and in January 1953 the Mount Road High School opened on the same site in 4 prefab classrooms while the old building was reconstructed. In October 1955 the name was changed to Lawson Brown High School.

In January 1937 a new high school with 57 children in Std 7 was started in the dining hall of the show yard.

Land for new buildings was given by the City Council adjoining the Dr. Viljoen Primary School and the school was to be named after W. Lawson Brown, who laid the foundation stone on 22 April 1938. The architects were Jones & McWilliams and the school was opened in 1939. Intended as a dual-medium school, from 1940 it became an Afrikaans-medium school and on 20 June 1949 the name was changed, in honour of Dr. G.G. Cillie. On 1 October 1955 the name of the Mount Road High School, in Illingworth Street was changed to Lawson Brown High School. Mrs. Ada Brown, widow of W. Lawson Brown, performed the opening ceremony.

On 22 April 1938, W. Lawson Brown laid the foundation stone of the new Lawson Brown Secondary School (Architects were Jones & McWilliams). The school began in 1937 in the show yard with 57 children in Standard Seven. It was opened in August 1939 by the Superintendent of Education.

== Allegations of racism ==
In 2016 students at the school accused staff of racism.
