= Mount Brown =

Mount Brown may refer to:

== Places ==
- Mount Brown (Antarctica)
- Mount Brown (British Columbia), Canada
- Mount Brown (Flathead County, Montana), a peak in Glacier National Park, U.S.
- Mount Brown (Liberty County, Montana), a summit in Sweet Grass Hills
- Mount Brown (South Australia)
  - Mount Brown Conservation Park, a protected area in South Australia
- Mount Brown (Papua New Guinea), the location of the first conversions to the Baháʼí Faith in Papua New Guinea

== People ==
- Mount Brown (philatelist) (1837-1919), British philatelist

== See also ==
- Brown Mountain (disambiguation)
- Brown Peak (disambiguation)
