= Cavell Brownie =

American statistician

- Born: Spanish Town, Jamaica
- Education: Cornell University
- Scientific career
- Workplaces: North Carolina State University
- Thesis: Stochastic models allowing age-dependent survival rates for banding experiments on exploited bird populations. (1973)

Cavell Brownie (née Sherlock) is a Professor Emeritus of Statistics at the North Carolina State University. Her research considered biometric methods and wildlife sampling.

== Education and career ==
Brownie is African-American, and was born in Jamaica. She earned her doctoral degree at Cornell University in 1973, developing mathematical models to estimate bird populations. Her dissertation, Stochastic Models Allowing Age-Dependent Survival Rates for Banding Experiments on Exploited Bird Populations, was supervised by D. S. Robson.

In 1975 she returned to Jamaica, living in Kingston.

Brownie was a faculty member at North Carolina State University from 1982 to 2007.She mentored female junior faculty and African-American students at North Carolina State University, meeting them regularly to discuss research and educational issues.<Cavell Brownie - AMSTAT News - American Statistical Association. (n.d.). https://magazine.amstat.org/blog/2020/02/01/cavell-brownie/ ></ref>ref name=":0">"Dr. Cavell Brownie Mentoring Faculty Award". North Carolina State University. Archived from the original on January 5, 2020.</ref>

== Research ==
Brownie's research involved wildlife sampling and biometric methods.

Her publications include:

- Brownie, Cavell; Hines, James E. (1990). "Statistical Inference for Capture-Recapture Experiments". Wildlife Monographs. 107 (107): 3–97. Bibcode:1990sice.book....3P. JSTOR 3830560.
- Brownie, Cavell (1985). "Statistical inference from band recovery data: a handbook". Wildlife Monographs: 101. Bibcode:1985usgs.rept..101B.
- Brownie, Cavell (1985). "Capture-Recapture Studies for Multiple Strata Including Non-Markovian Transitions". Biometrics. 49 (4): 1173–1187. doi:10.2307/2532259. JSTOR 2532259.

== Recognition ==
Brownie was awarded the George W. Snedecor award in 1983 and 1990, and the North Carolina State University D.D. Mason Faculty Award in 1988.

She was elected a Fellow of the American Statistical Association in 2003. The Department of Statistics at North Carolina State University award an annual Cavell Brownie Mentoring Faculty prize in her honor.

== Personal life ==
Brownie married Cecil Brownie, a Veterinarian at North Carolina State University, in August 1968. Together they have two sons.
