= Brownies (web series) =

Brownies is an independent comedy webseries created in 2012 by Farhan Arshad. The series centers around a South Asian protagonist (played by Arshad) who is on a documentary show about families that are trying to get their children married. During its first two months, the pilot episode reached over 178,000 views.

According to Arshad, there are plans to make eight episodes per season, with an aim to do at least three seasons. Arshad said he created the series because he wanted to tell a story from the American Desi perspective.
