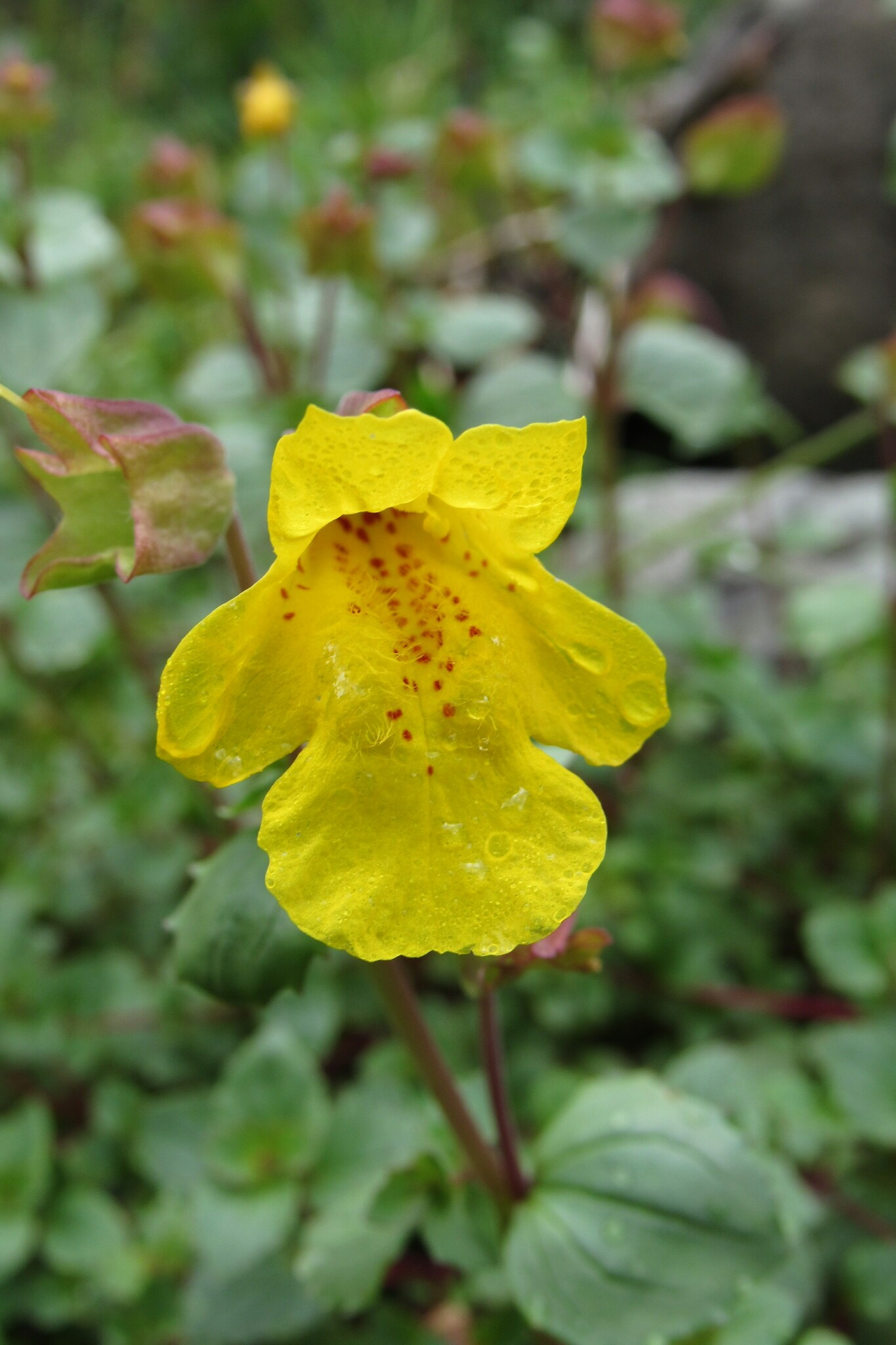
- Flower photographed in the Maroon Bells-Snowmass Wilderness

Conservation status
- Unranked (NatureServe)

Scientific classification
- Kingdom: Plantae
- Clade: Embryophytes
- Clade: Tracheophytes
- Clade: Angiosperms
- Clade: Eudicots
- Clade: Asterids
- Order: Lamiales
- Family: Phrymaceae
- Genus: Erythranthe
- Species: E. minor

Binomial name
- Erythranthe minor (A.Nelson) G.L.Nesom

Synonyms
- Mimulus alpinus Piper; Mimulus guttatus var. puberulus (Greene ex Rydb.) A.L.Grant; Mimulus langsdorffii var. alpinus Piper; Mimulus langsdorffii var. minor (A.Nelson) Cockerell; Mimulus luteus var. alpinus A.Gray; Mimulus minor A.Nelson; Mimulus puberulus Greene ex Rydb.

= Erythranthe minor =

Plant species in the lopseed family

Erythranthe minor, the Colorado monkeyflower, is a species in the lopseed family from the southern Rocky Mountains in the western United States.

== Description ==
Colorado monkeyflower is a perennial plant that forms colonies with frequently branching thread-like rhizomes, modified underground stems. Its above-ground stems grow straight upwards or nearly so, are 5 to 20 centimeters (2–8 in) tall, and branch. They are covered in somewhat stiff, small hairs, but the hairs can lack glands or some of them can be tipped with glands. Plants will have both basal leaves and those attached to the stems, each with three noticeable veins. They can be egg shaped in outline, somewhat elliptical, or like the head of a spear, measuring 0.8–2.5 cm long and 0.5–1.5 cm wide. The edges are shallowly dentate to denticulate, having teeth or small teeth, and hairless surfaces.

The flowers are in groups of one to three from nodes near the ends of the stems. The flowers are yellow and bilaterally symmetrical with funnel shaped tube opening to an upper and lower lip. They measure 0.9–1.1 cm. Blooming is usually in July or August, but can be as late as September in its native habitat.

== Taxonomy ==
Erythranthe minor was scientifically described in 1904 by Aven Nelson with the name Mimulus minor. Nelson described the species with a type specimen collected near Boulder, Colorado earlier the same year by Darwin Maxon Andrews and other specimens from around Colorado by other collectors. It was moved to the genus Erythranthe in 2012 by Guy L. Nesom. Together with its genus it is part of the family Phrymaceae. It has seven synonyms.

Table of Synonyms
Name	Year	Rank	Notes
Mimulus alpinus Piper	1906	species	= het.
Mimulus guttatus var. puberulus (Greene ex Rydb.) A.L.Grant	1924	variety	= het.
Mimulus langsdorffii var. alpinus Piper	1901	variety	= het.
Mimulus langsdorffii var. minor (A.Nelson) Cockerell	1911	variety	≡ hom.
Mimulus luteus var. alpinus A.Gray	1863	variety	= het., nom. illeg.
Mimulus minor A.Nelson	1904	species	≡ hom.
Mimulus puberulus Greene ex Rydb.	1906	species	= het.
Notes: ≡ homotypic synonym; = heterotypic synonym

=== Names ===
It is known by the common name Colorado monkeyflower, and was also called smaller mountain monkey-flower in the mid 1900s.

== Range and habitat ==
According to the Flora of North America (FNA) Colorado monkeyflowers are native to primarily Colorado with some in the mountains of New Mexico as far south as Wheeler Peak in Taos County. According to Plants of the World Online, the species is also native to Utah and Arizona, but the authors of the FNA report the plants in Utah's La Sal Mountains are misidentified Erythranthe guttata. The species grows at elevations of 3,000 to 3,700 meters (9,800–12,100 ft).

Their habitat is wet areas from the subalpine mountain forests to alpine tundra, such as along streams, around lakes, in intermittent subalpine water courses, and roadside ditches. As of July 2026 the species has not yet been evaluated by NatureServe.
