= Brown Engineering =

Brown Engineering may refer to:

- Brown University School of Engineering at Brown University, in Providence, Rhode Island
- George R. Brown School of Engineering at Rice University, in Houston, Texas
- Teledyne Brown Engineering at Teledyne Technologies, an American industrial company
