= Brown County =

Brown County is the name of nine counties in the United States:

- Brown County, Illinois
- Brown County, Indiana
- Brown County, Kansas
- Brown County, Minnesota
- Brown County, Nebraska
- Brown County, Ohio
- Brown County, South Dakota
- Brown County, Texas
- Brown County, Wisconsin

== See also ==
- Broward County, Florida
