= Brown College =

Brown College may refer to:

- Brown College (Minnesota), a for-profit career college with campuses in Minnesota
- Brown College (Rice University), a residential college at Rice University
- Brown College at Monroe Hill, a residential college at the University of Virginia
- Brown University, Providence, Rhode Island
  - College of Brown University, the undergraduate section of Brown University
- Brown Mackie College, a system of for-profit colleges
