= Brown River (Marlborough) =

River in New Zealand

- Location within New Zealand
- Location: Marlborough, New Zealand
- Coordinates: 41.205°S 173.563°E
- Type: River

Brown River is a river in Marlborough district, on South Island of New Zealand.
