= Brownie Carson =

American politician

Member of the Maine State Senate for District 24
- In office 2016–2020
- Preceded by: Matthea Daughtry

Personal details
- Born: November 15, 1947 (age 78) Lexington, Virginia
- Party: Democratic
- Education: Bowdoin College; University of Maine School of Law

Everett C. "Brownie" Carson (born November 15, 1947) is an American politician who represented District 24 on the Maine State Senate from 2016 to 2020. His district contains the towns of Brunswick, Freeport, Harpswell, North Yarmouth and Pownal.

== Biography ==
Carson attended Bowdoin College and the University of Maine School of Law. He is a veteran of the Vietnam War. Carson is an environmentalist and worked at the Natural Resources Council of Maine. Carson was previously the executive director since 1984. He was elected in the 2016 Maine Senate election. He was elected. He chaired the Environment and Natural Resources Committee. He did not seek re-election in the 2020 Maine Senate election. He endorsed the Elizabeth Warren 2020 presidential campaign.

Carson received the President's Award from the Maine Public Health Association (MPHA).
