= Browny Igboegwu =

Igbo-Nigerian actor (born 1976)

- Born: Brown Ifeanyi Igboegwu; 30 August 1976 (age 49); Ozubulu, Anambra State, Nigeria
- Education: Public Administration and International Relations, University of Nigeria, Nsukka
- Alma mater: University of Nigeria, Nsukka
- Occupation: Actor
- Years active: 2005–present
- Spouse: Becky
- Children: 1
- Awards: 2013: City People Award, Best Supporting Actor

Brown Ifeanyi "Browny" Igboegwu (30 August 1976 in Ozubulu, Anambra State, Nigeria) is an Igbo-Nigerian actor. His career in Nollywood began in 2005.

== Education ==
Igboegwu had his secondary school education at the All Hallow Seminary Onitsha. He went on to graduate from the University of Nigeria, Nsukka with a degree in public administration and international relations.

== Acting ==
Brown says acting comes naturally to him but he didn't dream of becoming an actor he got into acting by accident.

In 2005, he visited his friend, director Oke Ozubeluoko, on the set of a film, and noticed that a particular actor was making several mistakes. Igboegwu commented that he "could do better even when [he] had no experience as an actor"; Ozubeluoko gave him the role, and was impressed by his proficiency for acting.

As of 2015, Igboegwu has featured in over eighty movies, from his first film, Expensive Error with Hanks Anuku, where he played a cultist. Igboegwu is perhaps best known for his role in the 2005 film Marry Me, with Nonso Diobi and Oge Okoye, among others.

Igboegwu was named the twelfth chairman of the Anambra state chapter of the Actors Guild of Nigeria in late February 2015, and on 9 March, he was made the executive National Secretary, Conference of Chairmen, Actors Guild of Nigeria.

== Personal life ==
In early 2014, Igboegwu married his wife Becky.

== Awards ==
He has received numerous awards within and outside the country from his alma mata to various organizations both small and big, within and outside the movie circle to celebrate his achievements and his strides towards the progress of the Nollywood movie industry in Nigeria.

- 2013: City People Award, Best Supporting Actor.

== Philanthropy ==
Igboegwu is the head of the board of trustees for Brownbourg Foundation of his Brownbourg Koncept media agency, some of his activities include visiting of various orphanages almost monthly and handing out relief materials.
