= Brown River (Tasman) =

River in Tasman, New Zealand

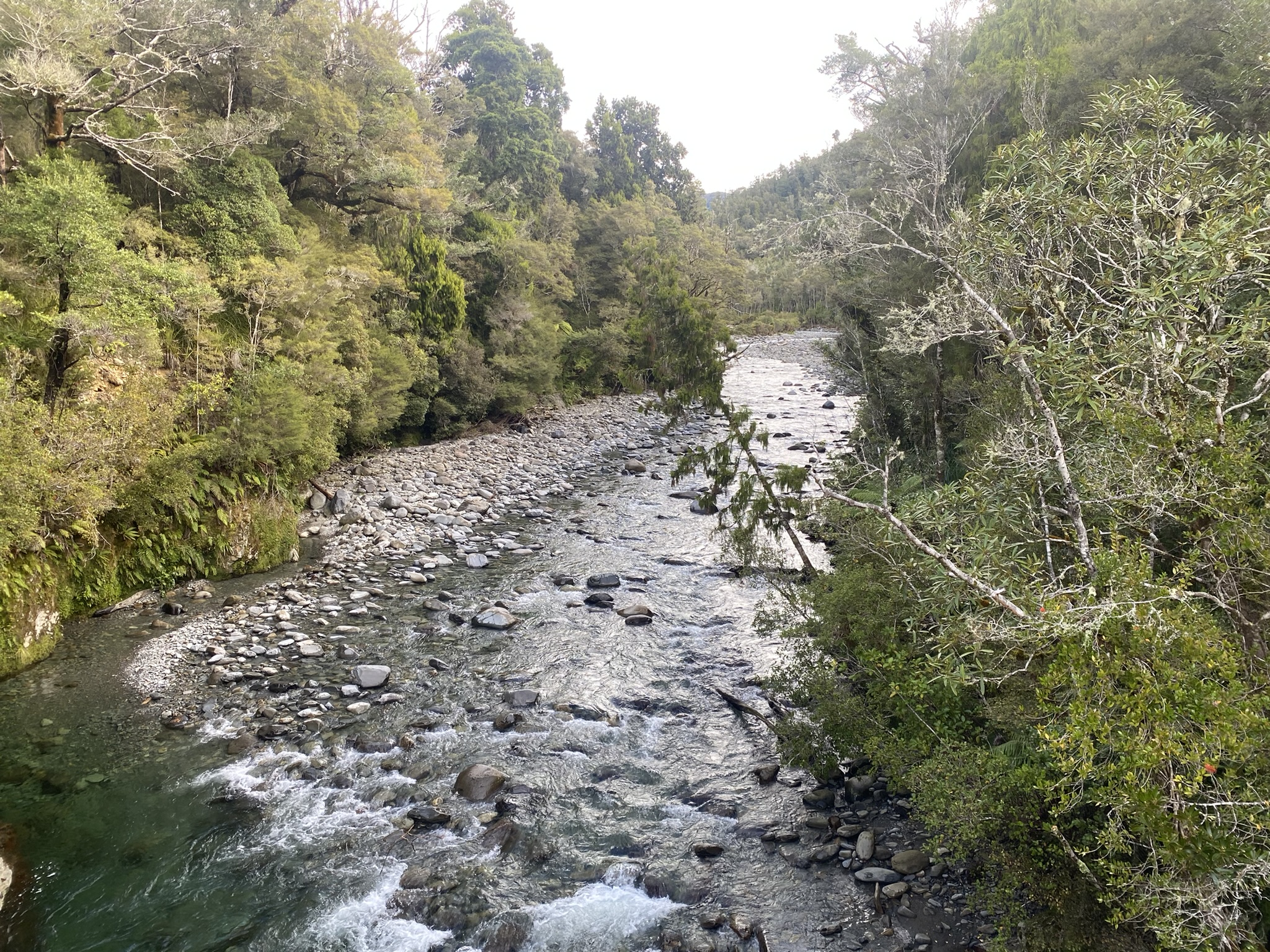
- Brown River seen from the Heaphy Track bridge

Brown River is a river in Tasman, New Zealand.

The source of the Brown River is near Brown Hill (elevation 1,104 metres or 3,622 feet) and the river flows north from the ridgeline adjacent to this hill. The Heaphy Track is on the south side of that ridgeline, with the river's source roughly halfway between Aorere Shelter and Flanagans Corner (the track's highest elevation). Near the Brown River's confluence with the Aorere River, the Heaphy Track crosses it via a bridge. Near this location is Brown Hut, which is near the start of the track at its Golden Bay / Mohua terminus.

In October 1856, James Mackay and John Clark explored the headwaters of the Aorere River. One night, they camped opposite a hill that they called "Brownhill" due to a large brown patch on it. The source does not state that Brown River got its name from Brown Hill, though.

Brown River
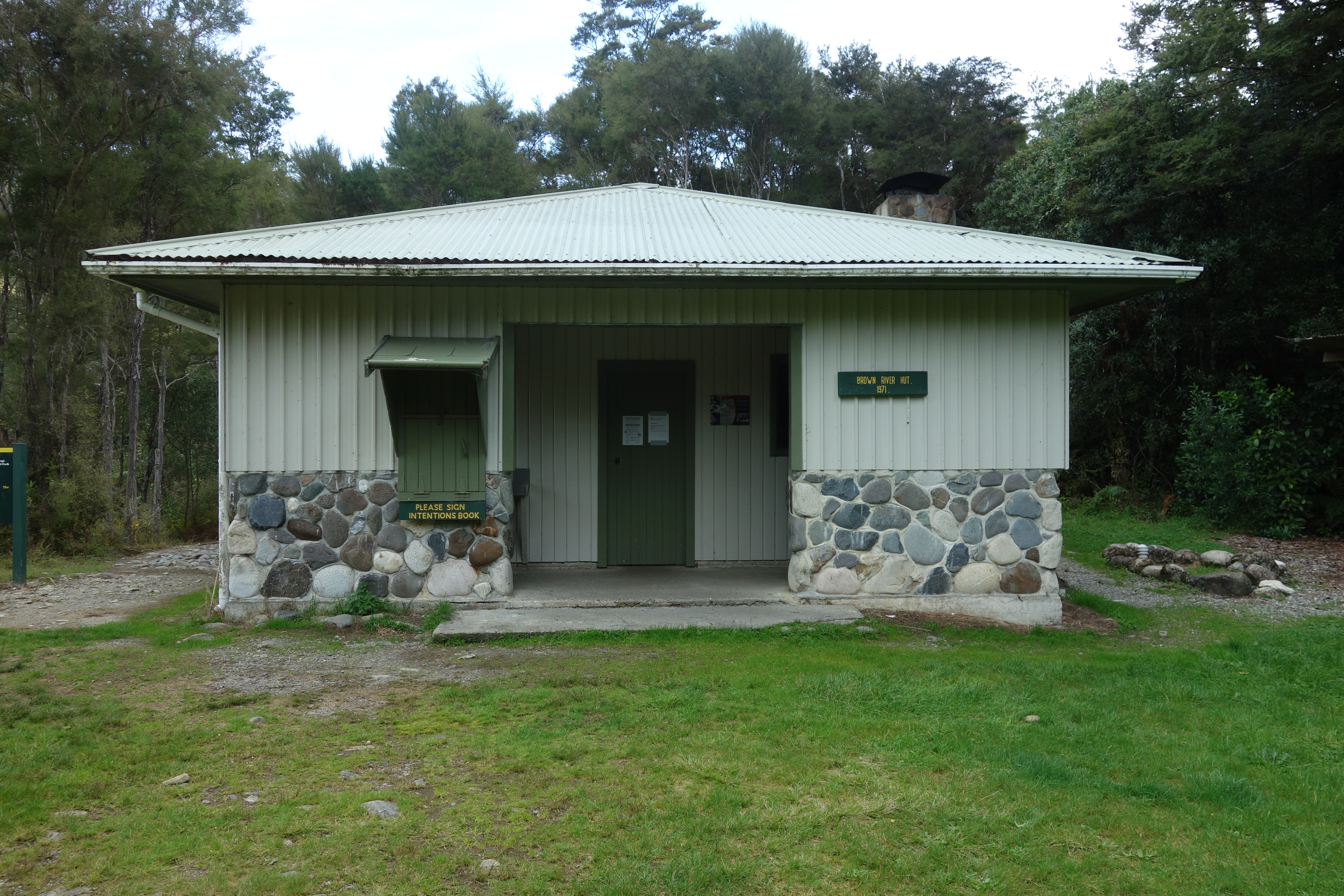
Brown Hut

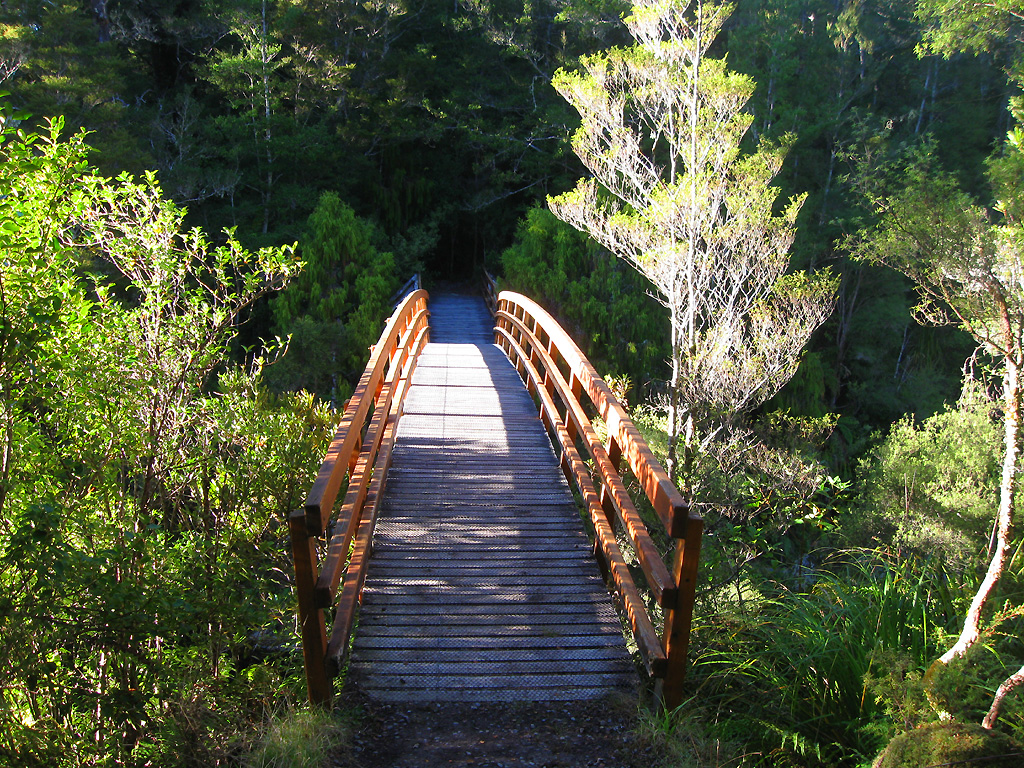
Heaphy Track bridge over Brown River

== See also ==
- List of rivers of New Zealand
