= Brownie Foreman =

American baseball player (1875–1926)

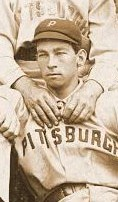
- Pitcher
- Born: August 6, 1875; Baltimore, Maryland, U.S.
- Died: October 10, 1926 (aged 51); Baltimore, Maryland, U.S.
- Batted: Left Threw: Left

MLB debut
- July 18, 1895, for the Pittsburgh Pirates

Last MLB appearance
- September 22, 1896, for the Cincinnati Reds

MLB statistics
- Win–loss record: 12–12
- Earned run average: 4.97
- Strikeouts: 81
- Stats at Baseball Reference

Teams
- Pittsburgh Pirates (1895–1896); Cincinnati Reds (1896)

John Davis "Brownie" Foreman (August 6, 1875 – October 10, 1926) was an American professional baseball pitcher. He played in the major leagues for the Pittsburgh Pirates and the Cincinnati Reds of the National League during 1895–1896. Listed at 5 feet 8 inches (1.73 m) and 150 pounds (68 kg), he threw and batted left-handed.

In a two-season major league career, Foreman posted a 12–12 record with a 4.97 earned run average in 32 games pitched (29 starts), while registering 20 complete games, one shutout, and 224 1/3 innings pitched. Foreman also played several minor leagues seasons, competing in the Virginia State League in 1895, the Western League in 1897, the Canadian League in 1898, and the Eastern League in 1900.

Foreman died in his hometown of Baltimore in 1926, aged 51. His older brother, Frank Foreman (nicknamed "Monkey"), was also a major league pitcher.
