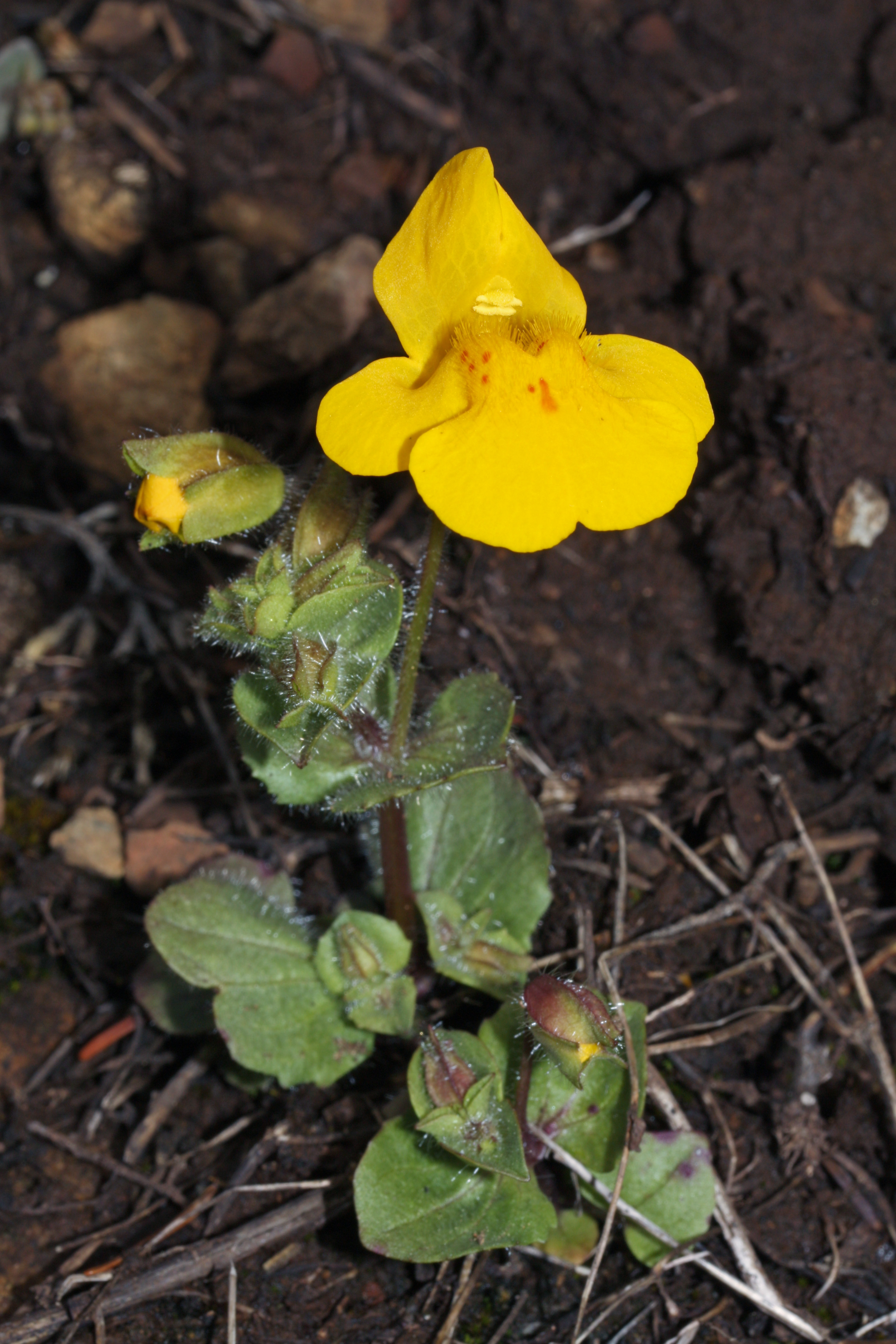

Conservation status
- Least Concern (IUCN 3.1)

- Secure (NatureServe)

Scientific classification
- Kingdom: Plantae
- Clade: Tracheophytes
- Clade: Angiosperms
- Clade: Eudicots
- Clade: Asterids
- Order: Lamiales
- Family: Phrymaceae
- Genus: Erythranthe
- Species: E. guttata

Binomial name
- Erythranthe guttata (DC.) G.L.Nesom

Synonyms
- Synonymy: Mimulus clementinus Greene; Mimulus cupriphilus Macnair; Mimulus duplex Wettst.; Mimulus equinus Greene; Mimulus exquisitus J.Muir; Mimulus formosa-elegans Ysabeau; Mimulus glabratus var. adscendens A.Gray; Mimulus grandiflorus Howell; Mimulus guttatus DC.; Mimulus guttatus subsp. typicus Pennell; Mimulus guttatus var. cupriphilus (Macnair) D.W.Taylor; Mimulus guttatus var. depauperatus (A.Gray) A.L.Grant; Mimulus guttatus var. gracilior H.St.John; Mimulus guttatus subsp. haidensis Calder & Roy L.Taylor; Mimulus guttatus subsp. litoralis Pennell; Mimulus guttatus var. lyratus (Benth.) Pennell; Mimulus guttatus var. platycalyx (Pennell) D.W.Taylor; Mimulus hirsutus Howell, nom. illeg. homonym. post.; Mimulus langsdorffii Donn ex Greene; Mimulus langsdorffii var. argutus Greene; Mimulus langsdorffii var. guttatus (DC.) Jeps.; Mimulus langsdorffii var. minima J.K.Henry; Mimulus langsdorffii var. platyphyllus Greene; Mimulus luteus var. depauperatus A.Gray; Mimulus lyratus Benth.; Mimulus maclainii Ysabeau; Mimulus paniculatus Greene; Mimulus petiolaris Greene; Mimulus pictus Ysabeau; Mimulus platycalyx Pennell; Mimulus prionophyllus Greene; Mimulus whipplei A.L.Grant

= Erythranthe guttata =

Plant species in the lopseed family

Erythranthe guttata, with the common names seep monkeyflower and common yellow monkeyflower, is a yellow bee-pollinated annual or perennial flowering plant. It was formerly known as Mimulus guttatus.

Erythranthe guttata is a model organism for biological studies, and in that context is still referred to as Mimulus guttatus. There may be as many as 1000 scientific papers focused on this species. The genome is being studied in depth.

For combined research of evolution, genetics, and ecology, particularly plant-insect interactions, the yellow monkeyflower has become a model system. With the help of physically resistant protections called trichomes, which have been thoroughly examined, the yellow monkeyflower defends itself against herbivores.

== Description ==
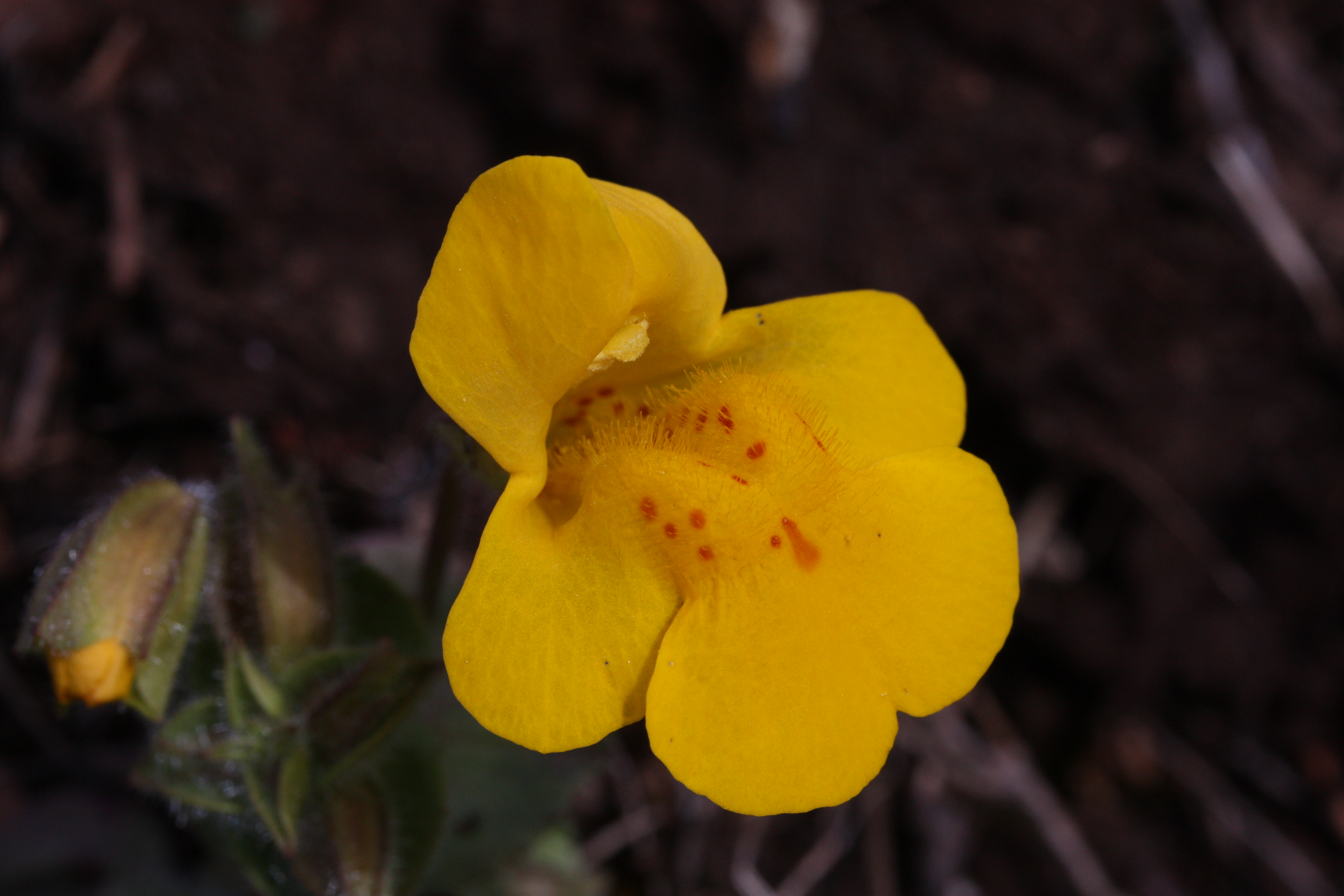
The lower lip may have one large to many small red to reddish brown spots. The opening to the flower is hairy.

A highly variable plant, taking many forms, E. guttata is a species complex in that there is room to treat some of its forms as different species by some definitions.

The plant ranges from 10 to 80 centimetres (4 to 31 1/2 in) tall with disproportionately large, 2 to 4 cm long, tubular flowers. The perennial form spreads with stolons or rhizomes. The stem may be erect or recumbent. In the latter form, roots may develop at leaf nodes. Sometimes dwarfed, it may be hairless or have some hairs.

Leaves are opposite, round to oval, usually coarsely and irregularly toothed or lobed. The bright yellow flowers are born on a raceme, most often with five or more flowers.

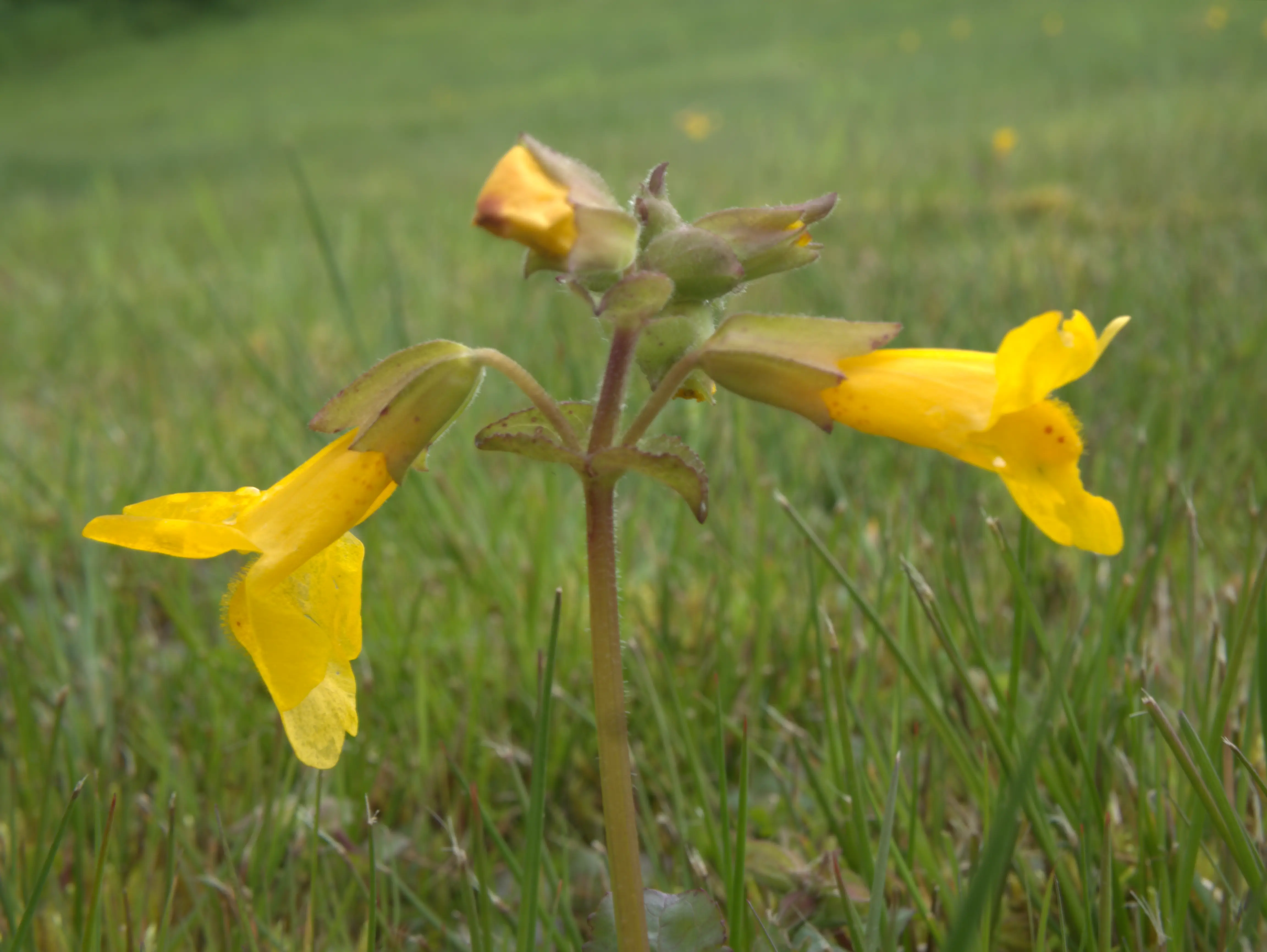
juvenile monkeyflower showing stem and calyx

The calyx has five lobes that are much shorter than the flower. Each flower has bilateral symmetry and has two lips. The upper lip usually has two lobes; the lower, three. The lower lip may have one large to many small red to reddish brown spots (hence the name guttata, which is Latin for 'spotted'). The opening to the flower is hairy.

Erythranthe guttata is pollinated by bees, such as Bombus species. Inbreeding reduces flower quantity and size and pollen quality and quantity. E. guttata also displays a high degree of self-pollination. Erythranthe nasuta (Mimulus nasutus) evolved from E. guttata in central California between 200,000 and 500,000 years ago and since then has become primarily a self-pollinator. Other differences have occurred since then, such as genetic code variations and variations in plant morphology. E. guttata prefers a wetter habitat than E. nasuta.

== Taxonomy ==
Erythranthe guttata was given its first scientific name, Mimulus guttatus, in 1813 by Augustin Pyramus de Candolle. In 2012 it was moved to the genus Erythranthe by Guy L. Nesom, giving the species its accepted name. Together with its genus it is classified in the family Phrymaceae. According to Plants of the World Online it has 32 synonyms.

Table of Synonyms
Name	Year	Rank	Notes
Mimulus clementinus Greene	1909	species	= het.
Mimulus cupriphilus Macnair	1989	species	= het.
Mimulus duplex Wettst.	1891	species	= het.
Mimulus equinus Greene	1906	species	= het.
Mimulus exquisitus J.Muir	1874	species	= het.
Mimulus formosa-elegans Ysabeau	1851	species	= het.
Mimulus glabratus var. adscendens A.Gray	1886	variety	= het.
Mimulus grandiflorus Howell	1901	species	= het.
Mimulus guttatus DC.	1813	species	≡ hom.
Mimulus guttatus var. cupriphilus (Macnair) D.W.Taylor	2010	variety	= het.
Mimulus guttatus var. depauperatus (A.Gray) A.L.Grant	1924	variety	= het.
Mimulus guttatus var. gracilior H.St.John	1963	variety	= het.
Mimulus guttatus subsp. haidensis Calder & Roy L.Taylor	1965	subspecies	= het.
Mimulus guttatus subsp. litoralis Pennell	1947	subspecies	= het.
Mimulus guttatus var. lyratus (Benth.) Pennell	1941	variety	= het.
Mimulus guttatus var. platycalyx (Pennell) D.W.Taylor	2010	variety	= het.
Mimulus guttatus subsp. typicus Pennell	1947	subspecies	≡ hom., not validly publ.
Mimulus hirsutus Howell	1901	species	= het., nom. illeg.
Mimulus langsdorffii Donn ex Greene	1895	species	≡ hom., nom. superfl.
Mimulus langsdorffii var. argutus Greene	1895	variety	= het.
Mimulus langsdorffii var. guttatus (DC.) Jeps.	1901	variety	≡ hom., nom. superfl.
Mimulus langsdorffii var. minima J.K.Henry	1915	variety	= het.
Mimulus langsdorffii var. platyphyllus Greene	1895	variety	= het.
Mimulus luteus var. depauperatus A.Gray	1876	variety	= het.
Mimulus lyratus Benth.	1835	species	= het.
Mimulus maclainii Ysabeau	1851	species	= het.
Mimulus paniculatus Greene	1906	species	= het.
Mimulus petiolaris Greene	1909	species	= het.
Mimulus pictus Ysabeau	1851	species	= het.
Mimulus platycalyx Pennell	1947	species	= het.
Mimulus prionophyllus Greene	1906	species	= het.
Mimulus whipplei A.L.Grant	1924	species	= het.
Notes: ≡ homotypic synonym; = heterotypic synonym

== Distribution and habitat ==
A herbaceous wildflower, Erythranthe guttata grows along the banks of streams and seeps throughout much of western North America from sea level to 12,000 feet (3,700 m). Both annual and perennial forms occur throughout the species' range. It blooms during spring at low elevations, during summer at high elevations.

It is found in a wide range of habitats including the splash zone of the Pacific Ocean, the chaparral of California, Western U.S. deserts, the geysers of Yellowstone National Park, alpine meadows, serpentine barrens, and even on the toxic tailings of copper mines. It is also very common in New Zealand near water bodies.

The flower is also an introduced species in Europe.

In the Faroe Islands this flower is called "laurusa blomstur" (e. Lauras flowers). It was brought to the islands in 1926 by an Icelandic woman named Arnþrúður Lára Pétursdóttir (called Laura Einarsson in the Faroe Islands). She brought the flower to Rituvík and from there it has spread across the Islands and is now very common.

== Cultivation ==
Erythranthe guttata is cultivated in the specialty horticulture trade and available as an ornamental plant for: traditional gardens; natural landscape, native plant, and habitat gardens.

== Uses ==
The leaves are edible, both raw and cooked. Leaves are sometimes added to salads as a lettuce substitute. They have a slight bitter flavour.
