= Warboys (disambiguation) =

Warboys is a village in Huntingdonshire, England.

Warboys or Warboy or War Boy or War Boys may also refer to:

== People and characters ==
- Warboys (surname)

=== "war boys" ===
- Young male soldier
- Male child soldiers, children who are used in war, as soldiers or in combat support
- Male military brat, a child or teenager of a military family
- Male war refugee, children who are refugees of war
- Male war children, those born to a native parent and a parent belonging to a foreign military force

=== Characters ===
- War Boys (Mad Max), characters in the Mad Max franchise, from the 2015 and 2024 films
- Warboy, a character in The Warchild, a 2002 novel by Karin Lowachee

== Arts, entertainment, media ==
- War Boy, 2000 novel by Kief Hillsbery
- The War Boy, a 1985 American film directed by Allan Eastman
- The War Boys, 2009 American film
- "War Boys" (Annabella Lwin song), 1986 single by Annabella Lwin
- "War Boys" (Toyah song), 1981 song by Toyah

== Other uses ==
- RAF Warboys, former Royal Air Force base outside the village of Warboys
- SS War Boy, former name of USS Yellowstone (ID-2657), United States Navy cargo ship

== See also ==
- War baby (disambiguation)
- War Child (disambiguation)
- Worboys (disambiguation)
