= War Child =

War Child or Warchild may refer to:

- Child soldiers, children who are used in war, as soldiers or in combat support
- Military brat, military slang for a child or teenager of a military family
- Refugee, children who are refugees of war
- War children, those born to a native parent and a parent belonging to a foreign military force
- War Child (charity), a Dutch, British and Canadian charity that helps children who are victims of warfare
- Childhood in war
- German childhood in World War II
- Finnish war children, evacuated from Finland to Sweden, Norway or Denmark

== Fiction ==
- Warchild, a 1982 novel by Richard Bowes
- Warchild (Cartmel novel), a 1996 Doctor Who spin-off novel by Andrew Cartmel
- Warchild (Lowachee novel), a 2002 science fiction novel by Karin Lowachee
- Warchild (Star Trek), a 1994 novel by Esther Friesner
- Warchild (film), a 2006 German-Bosnian film by Christian Wagner

== Music ==
- War Child (album), a 1974 album by Jethro Tull featuring the song "War Child"
- Warchild (album), a collection of songs by Paul Di'Anno's Battlezone
- "War Child" (song), a 1982 song by American band Blondie
- "War Child", a song by The Cranberries from the album To the Faithful Departed
- The Help Album, a charity album compiled by the War Child charity
- "War Child", a song by Hollywood Undead from the album Day of the Dead

== See also ==
- Joseph Wheeler (1836–1906), American military commander and politician, nicknamed "War Child"
- War baby (disambiguation)
- War Boy (disambiguation)
