= Childhood in war =

Impact of warfare on children

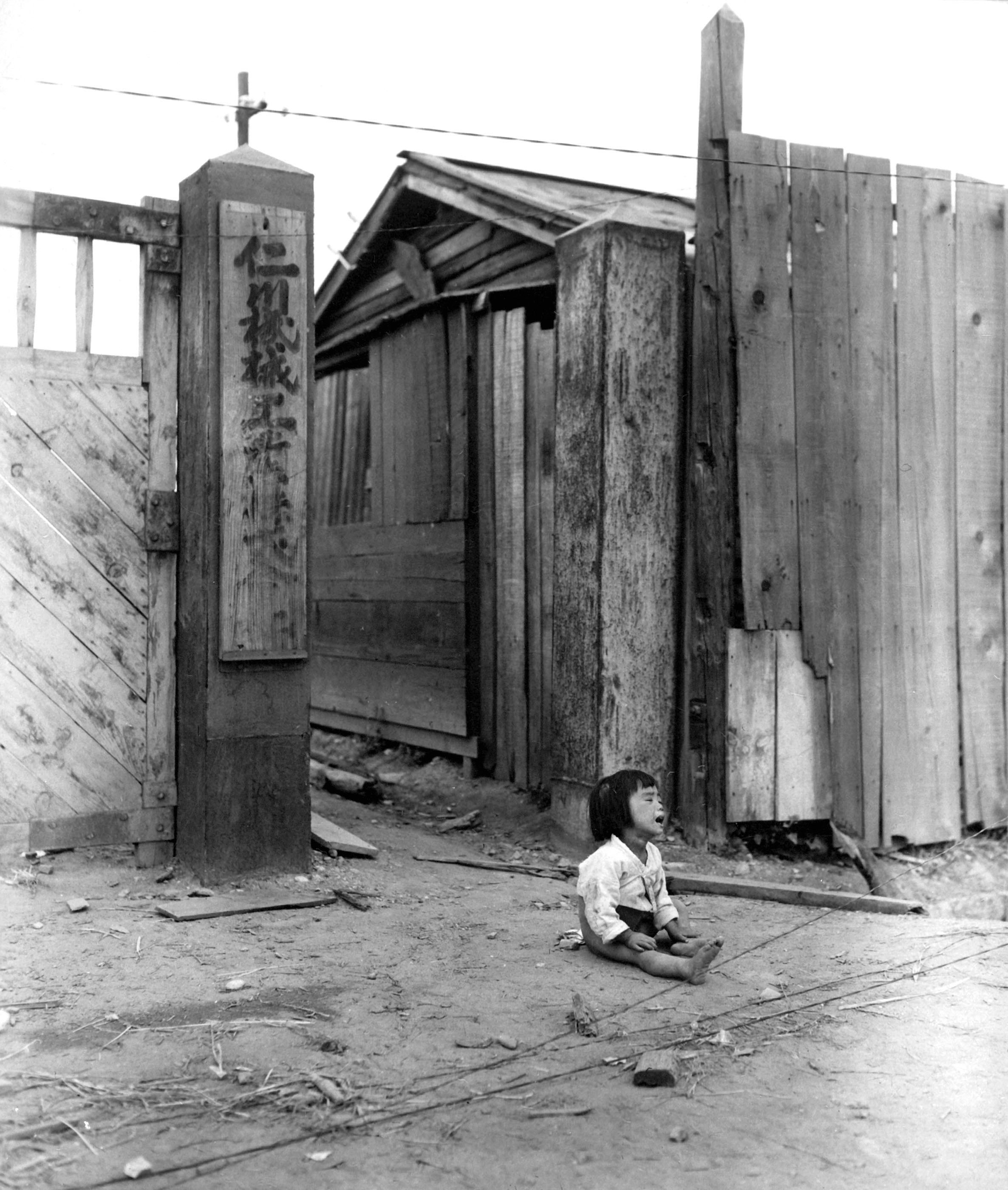
Child in Korean War (1950)

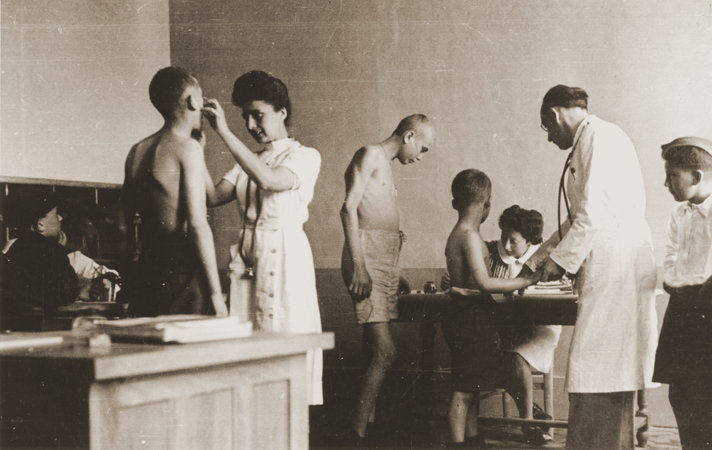
Buchenwald children examined by Dr Françoise Brauner (left) in 1945

Childhood in war refers to children who have been affected, impaired or even injured during and in the aftermath of armed conflicts. Wars affect all areas of involved persons' life, including physical and mental-emotional integrity, social relations with the family and the community, as well as housing. More often than not, these experiences affect a child's further development.

The Heidelberg Institute for International Conflict Research estimated that there were 226 politically motivated armed conflicts (of which 38 estimated as highly violent: 18 full-scale wars, 20 limited wars) worldwide during 2016. According to a Spiegel TV documentary in early 2016, estimated 230 million children live in war and crisis areas, experiencing everyday terror.

== War child ==
Children are generally the first to come to mind when victims of war and the aftermath of war are considered. They remain hidden behind the focus on political and material outcomes of war, even when war-induced injuries or disabilities become visible. The term war child takes on almost immeasurable significance when it is used consistently worldwide for all children of war across time.

In Germany, the concept of war child developed in the beginning of the 1990s when the generation that had experienced the Second World War during their childhood began to break their silence. Since then the concept of war child has received broad media attention, especially in Germany. At the same time, science and research have examined the phenomenon of the childhood of these war children.

Internationally, the concept of war child can take on interpretations that are different in other languages and can be associated with very different meanings. Differences, for example, become apparent when it relates to the war children in occupied Poland during the Second World War. The English term war child as well as the French term enfant de la guerre are used in some countries as a synonym for children who have one native parent and one parent from a member of an occupying military force. While that definition of war child is different from the definition in this article, they both refer to the Second World War. In France alone, the number of children of German occupying soldiers from the Second World War is estimated to be 200,000. Although these are children who grew up during war, they are usually associated with the deprivation and humiliation that is part of their origin which they, as well as their mothers, have experienced. While these experiences may lead to considerable impairment of identity and self-esteem, some of these children perceive the option of dual nationality as liberating.

Additional aspects arise when considering children of war outside of the European region or those of the 21st century. Conflicts like the atomic bombing of Hiroshima and Nagasaki in August 1945, the Vietnam War between 1955 and 1975, the 1971 Bangladesh genocide during the Bangladesh Liberation War, or the Syrian Civil War since 2011, all brought specific implications for the children of these wars. In Japan, the war children of that time still suffer from radiation-induced mutations. Regarding the Vietnam War, different consequences arose, depending on whether Napalm or the defoliant Agent Orange was used. The long-term effect on the war children in Syria, in Afghanistan or in Eastern Ukraine since 2014 are not yet foreseeable – with the exception of the numerous mutilations caused by land mines.

Occasionally the public becomes aware of symptoms that have been observed in refugee children from war zones. In April 2017, for example, unusual reactions were reported in Sweden: "Children fall into permanent unconsciousness when their families are threatened with deportation." Swedish physicians have been dealing with this phenomenon "for years" without being able to explain why there are no similar cases in other countries.

With respect to military use of children, of whom there are an estimated 250,000 around the world, additional issues come into focus. Events like the International Day Against the Use of Child Soldiers cannot help against the fact that every year "tens of thousands of children and young people are recruited as soldiers" – "some of them are only eight years old". On September 2, 1990, the UN Convention on the Rights of the Child came into effect which is intended to provide protection to children, including during times of war. It has been ratified by almost all member states and some non-member states. In 2002, an additional protocol came into force which ostracized the use of minors as child soldiers in armed conflicts. However, many states do not adhere to it. In Germany as well, minors are recruited for military service.

Individual war children who gain attention in the media and thereby bring the issue of war children into public view, represent exceptional cases. Those include Malala Yousafzai from Pakistan or Phan Thị Kim Phúc from Vietnam. Malala received the Nobel Peace Prize in 2014, jointly with her father. While Kim Phúc survived the use of Napalm in the Vietnam War in June 1972, she suffered severe burns. A photo of press photographer Nick Út made her known all over the world.

== Documentation ==
"No one wants to see children in war", states UNICEF. Yet, they are constantly at risk of being used for various, at times untrustworthy, purposes, and they are almost daily in the news. In the arts, however, they are seldom visible, even in times when painters, for example, created countless works dealing with war. There are isolated exceptions – in music, fine arts, and literature. The documentary treatment of the subject is different. Numerous documentary films and reports have emerged which bear witness to past and present wars and the children affected by them. Furthermore, many of the projects on this topic are based on materials by contemporary witnesses.

=== Documentary films and reports (in German) ===
- Panorama: Kriegskinder – Deutschland 1945, Syrien 2015 on YouTube
- Anne Frank Zentrum: Kriegskinder. Zeitzeugeninterviews on YouTube
- ZDF: Das Schicksal der Kinder von Aleppo on YouTube

ZDF: Die Kinder von Aleppo. Webstory

- Unicef: Kindersoldaten im Kongo on YouTube
- Terre des hommes: Was hat die Armee aus mir gemacht on YouTube
- ARD: Kindersoldaten in Syrien on YouTube
- Unicef: Kinder im Krieg on YouTube
- RheintalTV: Zum Töten erzogen. Kinder in Mosambik on YouTube
- Weltspiegel: Afghanistan – Kinder zwischen Krieg und Terror
- WDR: Auf ewig verseucht? Vietnam vierzig Jahre nach dem Krieg

=== Contemporary witness projects ===
The Protestant Adult Education center in Thuringia, Germany (Evangelische Erwachsenenbildung Thüringen) created a contemporary witness project in which war children have also found recognition. As part of the project, a traveling exhibition by historian Iris Helbing shows drawings by Polish war children from 1946. The drawings originated from a drawing contest for children 13 years and younger. The contest was arranged by the magazine Przekrój one year after its founding in 1945 and on the occasion of the anniversary of the liberation of Poland:

At that time, the drawings were regarded as important material in the investigation and documentation of crimes against Polish children by the National Socialists. The greatest number of these drawings is now in the Archiwum Akt Nowych in Warsaw. About 100 pictures are in the Polish Embassy in Copenhagen.

— Iris Helbing, Ausstellungen (Exhibitions)

World Vision in Germany has dedicated a still up-to-date traveling exhibition to war children. The exhibition, called "ich krieg dich" – "children affected by war" – has so far been shown in New York, Brussels, Frankfurt, Hamburg, Bremen, Rostock and Münster. In 2015 it was shown in Tröglitz, a small town in Saxony-Anhalt (Germany) whose mayor had resigned in March 2015 to protect himself and his family from right-wing Neo-Nazi attacks. A month later, a planned refugee shelter was ignited and in June the exhibition came to the town. It documents the life and world of children in war zones, highlighting four themes: home, everyday life, school and health. The exhibition's aim is to show "how violence, displacement and destruction" affect children and adolescents, focusing on Syrian refugee children. The singer Kirk Smith and a six-person gospel choir from Florida gave a benefit concert at the opening of the exhibition. World Vision has produced two videos, one on the topic of war children and one on the opening of the exhibition.

In 2009, the Museum of Military History (HGM) in Vienna had begun to address the subject of war children. This project was conceptualized when it was observed that some young people had begun to glorify war and that children used language about war weapons without being able to understand the meaning of the words. A video, published in November 2016, became part of a special exhibition Children in War – Focus: Syria. It tells the story of the project, the experiences of the witnesses – children and adolescents – from Syria, as well as the reactions of the students and their teachers who had attended the exhibition. They had the opportunity to speak with the witnesses, watch documentary films from Syria, and view the drawings of Syrian children, who – with children's naivety – had brought the cruelty of war to paper. In order to avoid possible traumatization of the visitors, the exhibition was limited to youth over the age of 13, as recommended by military psychologists. In February 2017, the HGM organized a week of action, on the topic of children in war, focusing on South Sudan. The aim of this exhibition was to provide "young people with insight into the problems of the present and to position the subject historically".

In 2011, a Global Conference was held at the UNESCO headquarters in Paris, " Childhoods in the War. Testimonies of Children about War" and an exhibition, "I Have Drawn Pictures of the War. The Eye of Françoise and Alfred Brauner ", showcased a selection of children's drawings from the exceptional "Alfred and Françoise Brauner" Collection of children's drawings in wartime from 1902 to 2001 (including the World War I, the Spanish Civil War, the World War II, the Israeli-Palestinian Conflict, the Algerian War, the Lebanese Civil War, the Vietnam War, the First Chechen War etc. ) which allows us to witness the major wars of the 20th century through the eyes of the children. The "Brauner" Collection of children's drawings was considered as being part of the common heritage of mankind, in a previous UNESCO touring exhibition held in 1999 and entitled "I've drawn the war. One century of children's drawings in the wars (1900-1999)", under the patronage of Simone Veil, which was shown in Paris, Hiroshima, Jerusalem, Vienna and more than 40 cities in Germany.

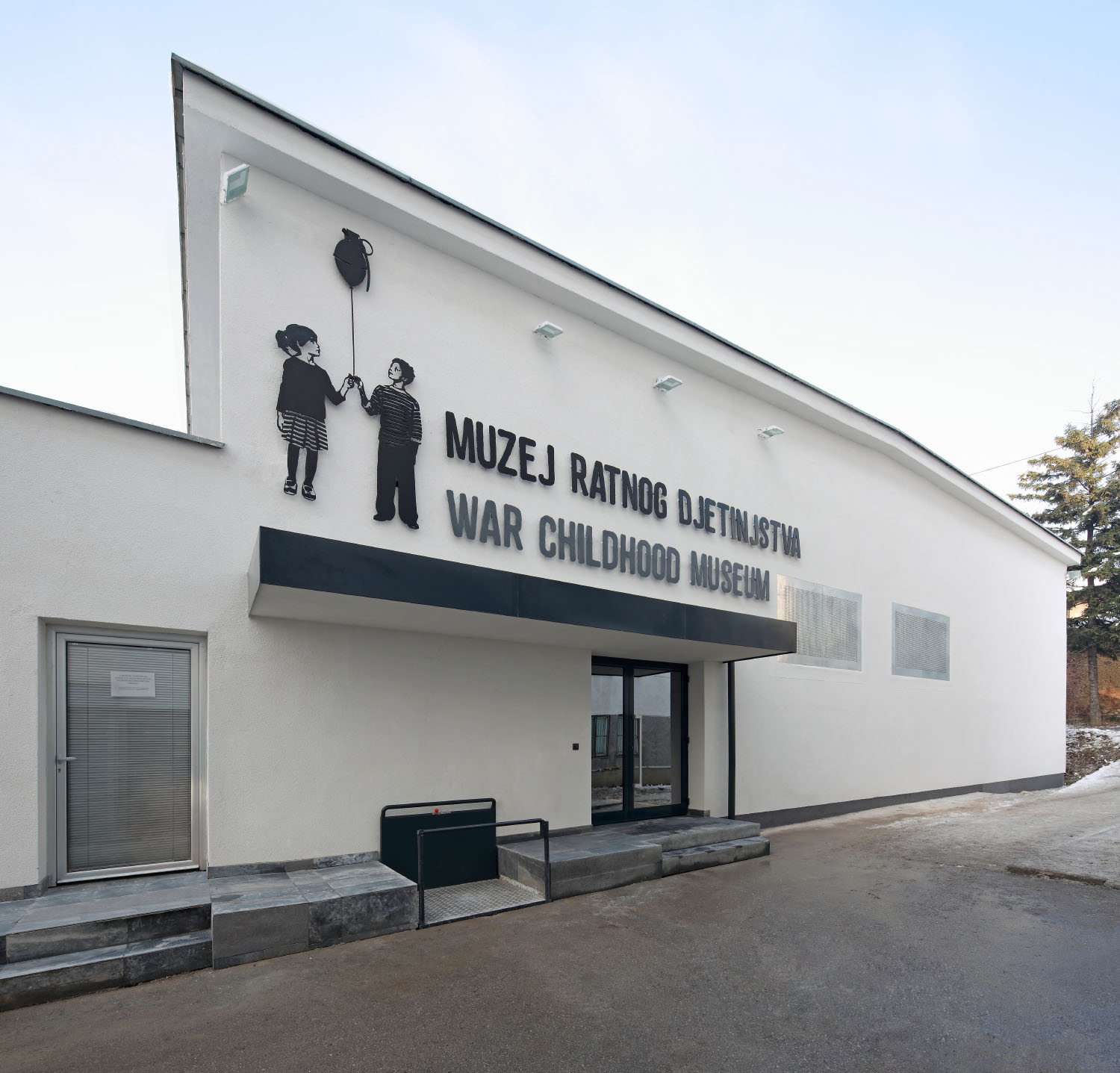
War Childhood Museum, Sarajevo (2017)

=== Collections ===
In January 2017, the War Childhood Museum, founded by Jasminko Halilović, opened in Sarajevo, the capital of Bosnia and Herzegovina. The ambassador of the museum is the Bosnian tennis player Damir Džumhur who, as Halilović, experienced the Bosnian War as a child. The museum collects every-day items of these war children, including clothes and toys, drawings and letters, but also photographs and diaries. In addition, there are audio and video documentaries of interviews by those who witnessed the war as children. Part of the collection was exhibited in 2016 at the Historical Museum of Bosnia and Herzegovina.

UNICEF estimated that of the 70,000 children who were living in Sarajevo at the time, 40% were shot at, another 39% watched as family members were killed, and 89% were forced to live in hiding in order to find shelter from the bombing. In 2013, as a preamble to the founding of the museum, Halilović published a book that tells the stories of these war children. It has now been translated into six languages. In German, it was published by Mirno More, an organization for socio-educational peace projects. The Center for South Eastern European Studies presented the book in November 2013.

Halilović dedicated his project – which inspired the book and the museum – to his friend Mirela Plocic, who was killed in 1994. In December 2015, he provided further insights about his motivations regarding his engagement in the children of the Bosnian War to the magazine Guernica.

== Charities ==
- Save the Children
- UNICEF
- Terre des hommes
- War Child (charity)
- World Vision International
- Red Hand Day (International Day against the Use of Child Soldiers)

== Literature ==
The titles of the following publications have been translated from German or French into English and have been put in brackets.

- Horst Schäfer (2008), Kinder, Krieg und Kino. Filme über Kinder und Jugendliche in Kriegssituationen und Krisengebieten (Children, War, and Cinema. Movies about children and youth in war situations and crisis areas) (in German), Konstanz: UVK-Verlagsgesellschaft, ISBN 978-3-86764-032-9
- Barbara Gladysch (2007), Die kleinen Sterne von Grosny. Kinder im schmutzigen Krieg von Tschetschenien (The Little Stars of Grosny. Children in the dirty war in Chechnya) (in German), Freiburg, Br., Basel, Wien: Herder, ISBN 978-3-451-29004-6
- Jan Ilhan Kizilhan (2000), Zwischen Angst und Aggression. Kinder im Krieg (Between Fear and Aggression. Children in War) (in German), Bad Honnef: Horlemann, ISBN 978-3-89502-118-3
- Sabine Bode (2013) [2004], Die vergessene Generation – Die Kriegskinder brechen ihr Schweigen (The Forgotten Generation – The war children are breaking their silence) (in German), München: Klett-Cotta, ISBN 978-3-608-94797-7
- Sabine Bode (2013) [2009], Kriegsenkel. Die Erben der vergessenen Generation (Grand-Children of War. The heirs of the forgotten generation) (in German), Stuttgart: Klett-Cotta, ISBN 978-3-60894808-0
- Ludwig Janus, ed. (2006), Geboren im Krieg. Kindheitserfahrungen im 2. Weltkrieg und ihre Auswirkungen (Born During the War. Childhood experiences and consequences) (in German), Gießen: Psychosozial, ISBN 978-3-89806-567-2
- Jean-Paul Picaper, Ludwig Norz (2005), Die Kinder der Schande. Das tragische Schicksal deutscher Besatzungskinder in Frankreich (Children of Shame. The tragic fate of children in France whose fathers were members of the occupying German military) (in German), München, Zürich: Piper, ISBN 978-3-492-04697-8
- Heela Najibullah (2017), Reconciliation and Social Healing in Afghanistan. A Transrational and Elicitive Analysis Towards Transformation, Wiesbaden: Springer Fachmedien, ISBN 978-3-658-16931-2
- Yury Winterberg, Sonya Winterberg (2009), Kriegskinder. Erinnerungen einer Generation (War Children. Memories of a generation) (in German), Berlin: Rotbuch, ISBN 978-3-86789-071-7
- Detlef R. Mittag (1995), Internationale Liga für Menschenrechte (ed.), Kriegskinder. Kindheit und Jugend um 1945. Zehn Überlebensgeschichten (War Children. Childhood and youth around 1945. Ten stories of survivors) (in German), Berlin
- Alfred Brauner, Françoise Brauner (1991), J'ai dessiné la guerre. Le dessin d'enfant dans la guerre - Ich hab' den Krieg gezeichnet. Kinderzeichnung im Krieg - I've drawn the war. Children's Drawings in the War (in French), Paris: Elsevier (ed.Scientifiq.), ISBN 978-2704613786
- Adriana Altaras (2016-05-19), "Ausflug ins Land der Dichter und Henker (Journey into the Land of Poets and Hangmen)", Zeit Online (in German)
- Bettina Alberti (2010), Seelische Trümmer. Geboren in den 50er- und 60er-Jahren: Die Nachkriegsgeneration im Schatten des Kriegstraumas (Mental Ruins. Born in the 1950s and 1960s: The post-war generation in the shadows of the war trauma) (in German), München: Kösel, ISBN 978-3-466-30866-8
- Dietrich Bäuerle (2011), Kriegskinder. Leiden – Hilfen – Perspektiven (War Children. Suffering - Supports - Perspectives) (in German), Karlsruhe: Von-Loeper, ISBN 978-3-86059-433-9
- Heike Möhlen (2005), Ein psychosoziales Interventionsprogramm für traumatisierte Flüchtlingskinder. Studienergebnisse und Behandlungsmanual (A Psycho-Social Intervention Program for Traumatized Refugee Children. Research results and treatment manual) (in German), Gießen: Psychosozial, ISBN 978-3-89806-413-2
- Werner Remmers, Ludwig Norz, ed. (2008), Né maudit – Verwünscht geboren – Kriegskinder (Cursed at Birth – War Children), Experienzawast 2 (in German), Berlin: C & N, ISBN 978-3-939953-02-9
- Werner Remmers, Ludwig Norz (2013), Kriegskinder – enfants de guerre – children born of war, Experienzawast 3 (in German), Berlin: C&N, ISBN 978-3-939953-05-0
- Winfried Behlau, ed. (2015), Distelblüten. Russenkinder in Deutschland (Thistle Blossoms. Russian children in Germany) (in German), Ganderkesee: con-thor, ISBN 978-3-944665-04-7

== See also ==
- Anne Frank
- Child of Heimatvertriebene
- Children in the Holocaust
- Children in the Israeli–Palestinian conflict
- Evacuations of children in Germany during World War II
- Finnish war children
- German childhood in World War II
- Kindertransport of Jewish children to Great Britain (World War II)
- Lebensborn (World War II)
- Malala Yousafzai
- Military brat
- Military use of children
- Phan Thi Kim Phuc
- Red Hand Day
- The Diary of a Young Girl
- The Holocaust
- War Child (charity)
- War Childhood Museum
- War children (German: Besatzungskind)
- Wolf children (World War II)
- Youth Aliyah
