= German childhood in World War II =

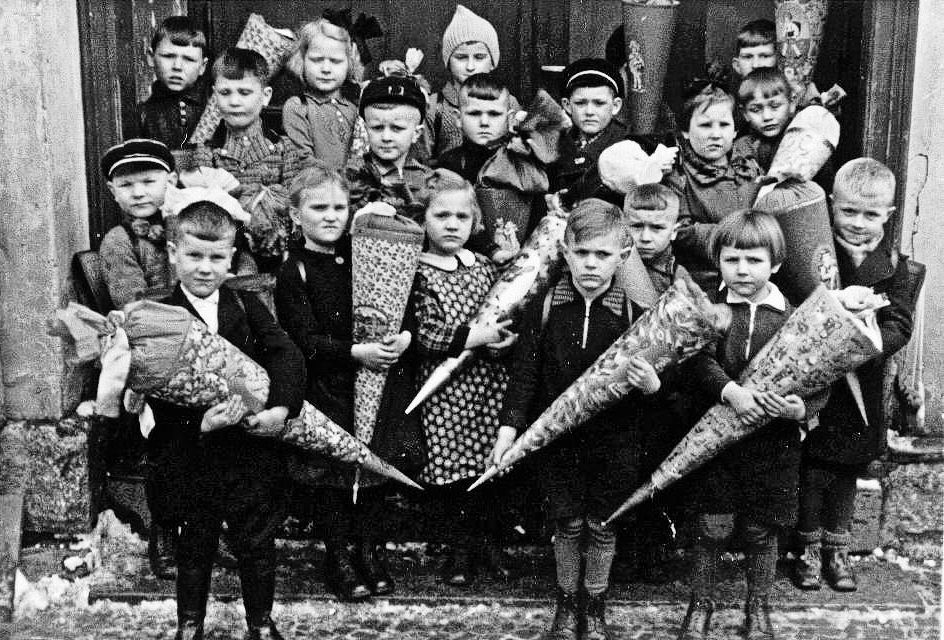
First day of school for children in Haynrode/Germany (1940).

German childhood in World War II describes how the Second World War, as well as experiences related to it, directly or indirectly impacted the life of children born in that era. In Germany, these children became known as Kriegskinder (war children), a term that came into use due to a large number of scientific and popular science publications which have appeared increasingly since the 1990s. They describe the same phenomena from different perspectives, using diverse methods and various stylistic means. The literature on this subject has not yet been able to produce a universal and binding definition. However, there is consensus that the impact of war on children can be felt decades later, often increasing with advancing age, and that at times the impact can be passed on mute to subsequent generations.

== "War child" ==
"War does not stop when the weapons fall silent." Into this simple formula German author Sabine Bode condensed the impact of war on human health. In 2015, on the occasion of the seventieth anniversary of Germany's capitulation and liberation from the Nazis – Victory in Europe Day – she was invited by Phoenix (German TV station) to discuss "how we feel the war to this day" with respect to grandchildren of war. Together with Katrin Himmler, Randi Crott, and Jens Orback, Sabine Bode participated in a round table discussion. None of the participants provided a definition of the two main terms, children of war and grand-children of war. Katrin Himmler, however, named a critical characteristic when she stated that "by far the most" war children in Germany were impacted "not only by the war", but "also by the pedagogy of the National Socialists". Author Matthias Lore had already attempted a definition as early as 2014: "For those born between 1930 and 1945, the term war children have become understood as youth who were too young for direct participation in the war, but old enough to suffer from hunger, expulsion and bomb attacks, loss of family members, separation and fear of death."

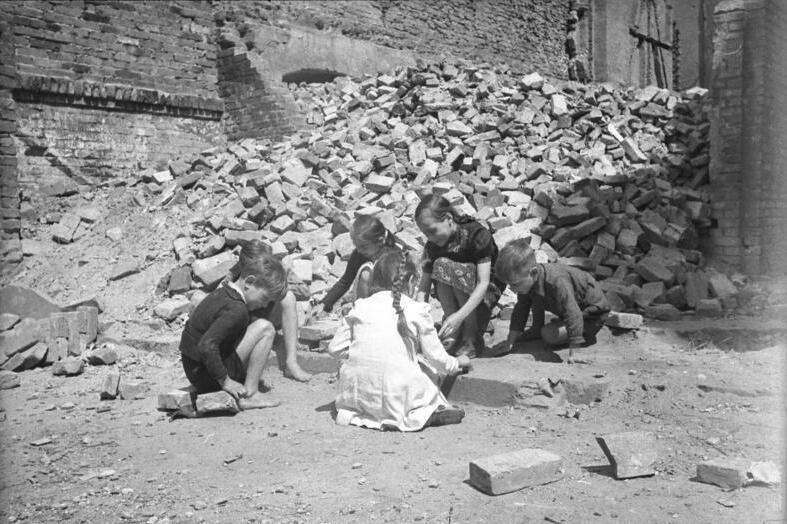
Children playing in ruins in Berlin (1948)

The concept is unquestionably aimed at a generation that spent part of its childhood in Germany during the Second World War, "for whom – without necessarily being threatened by organized annihilation – experiences of violence, separation, and loss were, at least to some degree, impacting their life". Not all authors agree which age groups to include. Some writers want to include children born shortly after the war because even in 1950, according to journalist Sabine Bode, "nine million children in West Germany lived in conditions that were inadequate, often unworthy for humans." Years later, war children and their younger siblings still played in ruins left over from bombings. There is also no agreement at the other end of the scale regarding what birth years to include. While Matthias Lohre and others include the children born in 1930, Michael Ermann restricts the term in his studies, referring to the "fate of the generation of non-Jewish Germans born in the Second World War". Jewish children, who were neither deported nor murdered, are generally not included in this definition. For them, the term survivors is used as they were exposed to additional and very specific threats to their lives which necessitated living in hiding. Anne Frank describes this in her book The Diary of Anne Frank which was published in German in 1950.

It is characteristic for the generation of the so-called war children of the Second World War that until the beginning of the 1990s they did not receive any attention either in scientific research or in the public consciousness. There was not even an awareness by those whose specific developmental backgrounds had been impacted.

— Christa Müller, Dissertation 2014

It cannot be assumed that the term has comparable meanings in languages of other European countries. For example, the English term war children, as well as the French term enfant de la Guerre, define the concept narrower, as a synonym for Besatzungskind – a child of a native mother and a father who is member of an occupying military force – describing implications associated with that situation.

Additional terms describing the various aspects and experiences of the war child generation, besides Besatzungskind, have also been developed in Germany. These include, for example, the children of Lebensborn (an association in Nazi Germany whose goal was to raise the birth rate of racially pure Aryan children), the children of forced laborers, or the so-called Wolf children who grew up without parents in the Baltics and had to hide their origins. Additional issues were raised with respect to war orphans or children of war-related rape. Further, the high number of children of married parents who had lost their father in the war or had never met him represent another group which has specific characteristics, as well as those children who had not met their fathers until after the end of the war or after their release from prisoner of war camps.

An extensive amount of literature deals specifically with the fate of Jewish children, like the Kindertransport which brought Jewish children to the UK, the rescue of Jewish children by Youth Aliyah Child Rescue, or the support of these children by the Swiss charity organization for emigrant children.

Finally, there is another group of children who are usually not considered war children because of their special affiliation with Heimatvertriebene, Germans who were forced to flee after being expelled from areas that became part of other countries during post-war restructuring. These expellees were, in contrast to the war children in general, a "public topic" during the post-war period "in the West of the divided country." Still another group are the war children of the First World War. They are generally not included in the relevant literature, although they should also be considered as such.

After years of efforts to bring together what the war children have in common, psychoanalyst Michael Ermann, in his farewell lecture on the occasion of his retirement in March 2009, came to the following conclusion: "The 'German war children' do not exist. Their fates are much too diverse. [...] All of this requires individual consideration rather than a generalization." But if there is something that "connects the different fates – the ones in the East, the West, the North and the South, the children of the night bombings and the refugee children" – then it would be a striking "lack of fright and consternation about one's own fate!"

== History ==
In 2003 – almost sixty years after the end of the war – Ermann, who describes himself as a "typical war child", launched Project War Childhood at LMU Munich. He was joined by a prominent international scientific advisory board. In 2009 the project was completed with a series of scientific publications.

There is an overwhelming number of war children who for decades have been treated with psychotherapy. Nevertheless, while there is hardly any literature dealing with the traumatization and the identity problems of the war children, the existing literature received very little acceptance.

— Michael Ermann, Lecture at the Südwestrundfunk radio station in Germany, November 2003

The Inability to Mourn, a book published by Alexander and Margarete Mitscherlich in 1967 that deals with the consequences of the war experience, found broad public attention among Germans. Even though the authors were primarily focusing on adults, they provided an impetus for later research on war children where the symptoms described by the Mitscherlichs were also found. The inability to mourn, they wrote, had produced a behaviour based on "denial" which may have led to "self-confidence more uncertain than it could have been."

It was not until the late 1980s, after 20 more years had passed, that the topic of childhood of war came into the public discourse in Germany. Why so much time had to pass is attributed to various factors. Ermann recalls "feelings of guilt [...] as a result of the Holocaust" and the "refusal to remember during the years of the Wirtschaftswunder", the economic miracle after the war. Finally, "trauma-specific defense mechanisms" should be taken into account. The journalist Hilke Lorenz said that the war children had fallen into a "history gap". And the author Alexandra Senfft, the granddaughter of the war criminal Hanns Ludin, recalled the taboos: "To deal with the crimes of one's own relatives hurts, it makes you afraid and sad." Even "thinking about the worst was a taboo in my family".

"Politically more volatile" was probably the feared "accusation by Shoa survivors" that "looking at war children" could lead to "relativize the murder of the Jews". In 2005, at the first interdisciplinary conference in Frankfurt – which had devoted itself to the war children – the representative of the Jewish congregation "distanced himself" from such a proposal. The answer clarified that "it was not a matter of opening up a ‘victim competition’ but, on the contrary, classifying one's own differentiated experiences into the European memory, as well as identifying the suffering due to the silencing of the ‘deeds’ by the parent generation." It is no coincidence therefore that Sabine Bode – in her book about grand-children of war – addressed the question of "how perpetrators became victims". in a separate section.

It is a grievous challenge in the exploration of the childhood of German war children to never forget that the horror and chaos are based on decisions and developments which the German people have caused themselves. However, to endure this tension can lead to the opportunity of internal growth.

— Michael Ermann, Südwestrundfunk radio station in 2003

Psychological testing was absent in the discussion until 1980 when the diagnosis of Post-traumatic stress disorder (PTSD) was included in the DSM III, the Diagnostic and Statistical Manual of Mental Disorders. Within less than 10 years thereafter, the publications on the psychological consequences of war on childhood increased in Germany. Since then, numerous authors have reported very personal accounts about their own childhood, have accepted this subject more generally, or have begun to publish scientific studies.

Bode noted that while 70 years after the end of the war an "academic review" had taken place – by representatives of various scientific disciplines – but that only recently an "emotional process" had begun. Katrin Himmler is also convinced that "we have not yet processed this within families". Anyone who tries to do this will sooner or later be confronted with the question of their own identity. Christa Müller drew attention to the fact that the "path to a mature national as well as individual identity [...] requires a self-critical examination of the far-reaching influences of the events in National Socialist Germany, in the Second World War and in the post-war period". For Raed Saleh, a German politician, the discussions about the term revolve around a question that "remains unresolved": "How does Germany define its national identity"? He suggests that we would have to "redefine" it:

We are the country that stands for diligence and hard work. For social market economy and societal balance. For Prussian tolerance and for diversity. We are the country that faces the abyss of its history.

— Raed Saleh, German newspaper Frankfurter Allgemeine Zeitung, February 18, 2015

"Politicians of the Alternative for Germany party are demanding to end memory culture in Germany, and they are not the only ones." On February 18, 2017, during a radio program titled There must be an end to it – Remembrance Culture in Germany – Ulrich Gineiger published a report about the pros and cons of this issue. In this report, representatives of both positions were heard. In the foreground were "older people [...] who spoke about their traumatic experiences during the Nazi regime" as well as how they remembered it in later years. In addition, the heads of various cultural institutions and memorial sites talked about their experiences with their visitors. The project Stolpersteine (Stumbling Blocks) by the artist Gunter Demnig which is receiving international attention also played a role in the documentation.

== Raising of youth during the Nazi era ==
The raising of children and youth during the National Socialist era was the lens through which not all, but most war children in Germany experienced the war and its effects. In 1934 one of the most powerful publishing houses of that period released a guidebook by Johanna Haarer – one of the well-known women in Nazi Germany – on the topic of infant care. This book, The German Mother and her First Child, was in its tenth edition at the end of the war. Its last edition was published in 1987, with changes that obscure its origin and ideology, not revealing the year of its first appearance. In her critical analysis of this and another book on child-rearing by Haarer, Sigrid Chamberlain concludes that child-raising and education in Nazi Germany and the early post-war years are characterized by coldness, harshness, and indifference. She views these theories as a "seamless transition into the ideology and the institutions of the Nazi state", stating that it is "time" to deal with the fact that "the majority of those born during the Third Reich and the post-war years were released into life with early Nazi ideology, without ever realizing this fact and its possible consequences." In 1977 the concept of "Black Pedagogy", introduced by sociologist Katharina Rutschky, was established, summarizing – among other concepts – the child-raising and educational methods of this period.

While Chamberlain had investigated the question of how it was possible to carry the ideology of the time into the nurseries, Hans-Peter de Lorent has been researching the socialization in the educational systems since the 1980s. Already politically active as a student, he recalls that "in 1968, for example, as speaker of the student counsel, I called for participation in the Sternmarsch, a march into Bonn – then the German capital – to protest against the proposed German Emergency Acts". In 1981 as "editor of the Hamburger Lehrerzeitung", a magazine for teachers, he had begun "to publish a series called Schooling under the Swastika" that dealt specifically with teachers who "resisted" the Nazi regime. In 1991, in a review of a book by Lutz van Dijk about resistance of teachers during the Nazi era, the educational scientist Reiner Lehberger stated that, as early as 1936, 97 per cent of teachers belonged to the Nazi Teachers Association and 32 per cent were members of the Nazi Party.

'The principal guilt of the contamination of youth with a Nazi ideology of violence is borne by the teachers who were paid by the German Republic. History will judge them severely. ... '– as was already documented in May of 1933 in a magazine by social democratic teachers who had emigrated to Czechoslovakia.

— Reiner Lehberger, Die Zeit

Van Dijk's critical view of the twelve years of the Nazi era shows – according to Lehberger – that in the early years, "expressions of indignation [...] were mostly punished with reprimands", whereas "during the war they were considered as 'Wehrkraftzersetzung'", subversion of the war effort, and "not rarely endowed with the death penalty."

In 2016, after years of research, using the city of Hamburg as an example, de Lorent published an 800-page book on the profiles of those teachers who taught war and post-war children in the schools of Germany. As a former school superintendent he was able to draw on earlier contacts who became very helpful in his research. Based on the profiles of 42 teachers, De Lorent not only described generally how "Nazi teachers made a career after the war", but he also described details, using a Hamburg physical education teacher as an example, who had lit synagogues during the Nazi period and who beat his students after the war The fact that pupils were still beaten by their teachers in the post-war years was not an exception, but the rule. "The so-called De-nazification had largely failed in the school system", wrote journalist Uwe Bahnsen in his discussion of de Lorent's book.

Further information about the socialization of children during the Nazi period can be found in two online portals. In addition to the NS Documentation Centre, the city of Cologne has put the Nazi Youth Project on the web. In this way, a vast amount of richly compiled historical material regarding the Second World War is made accessible to the general public. On the page Youth in Germany 1918 – 1945, the various efforts to influence the war children – such as in schools, camps, or the deportation of children – are brought together, dedicating a chapter to each topic. The collaborative portal Lebendiges Museum Online (LeMO), Living Museum Online provides, in addition to other topics, thousands of pages, pictures, audio and video files about the Second World War and the post-war years, among them, for example, the poster Youth Serves the Leader. The post-war years, described as collapsed society are documented under the title Life in Ruins.

== Experiencing the war ==
"What would be the proportion of those who experienced horrible things and those who were lucky", Bode asked in 2009, four years after the Congress In Frankfurt. According to Bode, the experts had been struggling since then "to come to estimate that one half had a normal childhood and the other half had not". For the latter group, it was assumed that 25 per cent [experienced] "short-term or isolated trauma and that a further 25 per cent were exposed to persistent and multiple traumatizing experiences."

According to Bauer, "many war children still seem to be striving to explain their war experiences as trivial and normal". This is an almost unanimous conclusion, in the media as well as in science and research. Matthias Lohre collected "typical phrases", like "that's the way it was" or "everyone experienced that", used by war children to regularly play down their own experiences. Ermann calls it the "speechlessness" of war children, that he sees as "a counterpart to the lack of interest" by the public towards this fate.

Many Germans compared their own suffering to that of the Jews, prisoners of war, and other victims of German barbarism. If at all, older people reported formulaicly about their experiences: 'Others were worse off than we.'

— Matthias Lohre, Zeit Online

Ermann refers in this context to a "myth of invulnerability of children". It was linked to the "ideology of heroism in National Socialism" which in an "unspoken way resonated in the processing of the Second World War, the Nazi period, and in post-war Germany. 'German' children are born to withstand hardship, and these children are not vulnerable. But if they are harmed, then they are not seen in their pain and suffering, but in their bravery with which they overcome their injuries."

The reality was different, as psychoanalyst Luise Reddemann reported in detail in her lecture in Bad Krozingen in 2006. And it was different for each of the war children. They brought with them individual preconditions and lived in different parts of Germany which were not all equally affected by the war. While some cities were laid in ruins and ashes, others were spared. While some children experienced hunger, there was enough food in other places. While some survived firestorms, others did not know what that was. Not everyone knew about the nights in the bunkers during the air raids, not all were bombed, entombed by debris or lost their physical integrity. Those who were surrounded by family experienced the war differently from those who were left abandoned after the loss of family. Some children witnessed the rape of their mother or sister. And those whose homeland was preserved could not imagine the distress of the expellees. Unknown is the number of children who were not spared the experience of death. "That's the way it was." Close your eyes and get through – was the motto.

== Consequences of childhood during war ==
When the war was over, the war children were confronted with their growing insight into the culpable entanglement of the parent generation. Emerging questions met denial or reactions of guilt and shame. Through the media they learned about the Nuremberg trials and were also witnessing societal efforts to restore a kind of normality which looked very different in the two parts of the country after the division of Germany.

In addition to Bode, Ermann considers the war children to be a "generation of the inconspicuous" that has "produced only a small number of significant personalities". Beyond such a view on the consequences of war on individual children – a fairly typical one – some authors also look at the possible societal consequences. One of these authors is Lloyd deMause. As a pioneer and one of the most important representatives of Psychohistory – a theory which is considered controversial – he connected the individual experience of the war children to the consequences that have broader societal impact. In several publications he analyzed the "expression of childhood trauma in politics" and came to the following daring conclusion:

Restaging as a defense against dissociated trauma is the crucial flaw in the evolution of the human mind, [...] tragic in [...] its effects upon society, since it means that early traumas will be magnified onto the historical stage into war, domination and self-destructive social behavior.

— Lloyd deMause, The Emotional Life of the Nations, 2005

A vacancy in the literature regarding the war children remains. Neither Ermann nor other authors refer to the fact that the war generation and the generation of the so-called Counterculture of the 1960s movement have common experiences. Rudi Dutschke, one of their most prominent representatives, was a war child.

== Characteristics of war children ==
The war children's experiences before the war, and their various experiences during the war are different for each of them. Yet, despite such diversity, there are similarities which characterize them. Age plays an important role in the processing of experiences. Andrea Bauer summarized the results of various studies and concluded that "children between 5 and 9 years of age experience the greatest vulnerability as they are very aware of the events, but do not yet have sufficient coping strategies". Moreover, Bauer states that children interpret their experience "more through the direct contact with their reference persons" rather than through "the event itself" – and how the reference persons "explain the events to the child, and in turn, how they interpret them for themselves".

In addition to the characteristics of war children already described, various features or symptoms can be identified. However, there are subgroups of war children about whom we still know "nothing", German psychoanalyst Hartmut Radebold said in an interview in 2010. He mentioned, as an example, "the children who have been sent across Europe to protect them from the war" or those "who were placed into orphanages after the war". In 2014, the German TV station Südwestrundfunk provided little-known details about the childhood of some war children with the publication of two documentaries. On December 7, 2014, a documentary film by Ina Held, titled Journey Into an Intact World: German War Children in Switzerland was broadcast. These children were often called "Swiss Children". Subsequently, Gerd Böhmer published the film "Escape Routes – When Jewish Refugees Wanted to Go to Switzerland". He had made this film together with students from Lörrach in order to "revisit the topic and create cross-generational interest".

=== Attributes ===
At times Ermann speaks of "quirks" when describing typical experiences or behaviors of war children. When these behaviours do not have symptomatic characteristics, they have long been regarded as personal whims rather than the consequences of war experiences.

If there is anything conspicuous about us, it is most likely the little quirks: hardly any of us feels comfortable throwing away clothes or food. For many, dealing with time shows remarkable relics relating to escape and air attacks: the delay of saying good-bye and of making decisions, waiting to the very last second to use every bit of time, feeling indecisive while traveling, the chaos before departures. Or those strange, often unnoticed, small phobias when descending into a subway station, for example. And being startled by something banal, like the sirens of fire trucks passing by, or the creeping discomfort when a lonely plane flies over a dark blue sky in September. Yes, moods, the sudden melancholy in a certain light, feeling touched by open landscapes, the unease during some afternoons or quiet evenings, or specific smells or sounds.

— Michael Ermann, Wir Kriegskinder

In addition, a number of "abnormalities" were found – also below the threshold which makes people seek professional help – such as "feelings of unfamiliarity" or "relationship disorders" or even a "feeling of great emptiness", and the "impression not to live one's own life, standing beside oneself somehow". "Early parentification" is occasionally mentioned, as well as an "oppressive sense of responsibility". Often the experiences of the war had "crept into the sense of identity as blind spots", Sabine Bode noted. In this context, she pointed to protective factors: "Most of the war children succeeded in keeping their memories of fright at bay, especially by immersing themselves in work." Luise Reddemann also recalled factors that protect them: "While it is true that traumatic experiences can cause damage and leave scars, it is also true that resilience can prevent people from carrying life-long trauma-induced injuries. These factors should not be overlooked, as has happened for a long time."

Radebold, who sees himself as a war child, reminds of "the so-called egosyntonic behavior[s] of the war children. These are behaviours we all know: being thrifty, working hard and diligently, planning, organizing, being altruistic, looking after others and not oneself". But, on the other hand, they "did not learn to take care of their body".

=== Symptoms and disorders ===
Some war children became ill, some recovered, others did not. Still others experienced first symptoms later, at an advanced age. According to Ermann, war children "as adults are generally more at risk of suffering from psychological disorders than others". Even losing the conscious memory does not guarantee protection from illness. The Body Does Not Forget was the title of an article based on a comment by Erman, published by the German magazine Der Spiegel in 2009.

At the Frankfurt Congress in 2005, psychoanalyst and author Marianne Leuzinger-Bohleber spoke about a long-term study in which several scientists participated, stating that it had shown "a higher than expected" number of patients suffering from consequences of the war: "Long-term physical damage due to poor nutrition, problems with self-care, psychosomatic complaints, loneliness, escape into achievement, empathy disorders, identity, and relationship disorders."

Ermann's research showed that war children today are much more likely to suffer from psychological disorders such as anxiety, depression and psychosomatic complaints than the population at large. About a quarter of the war children interviewed by Ermann was severely restricted in their psycho-social quality of life and one in every ten was traumatized or had significant traumatic complaints. ‘These people suffer from recurrent, relentless war memories, anxiety attacks, depression and psychosomatic complaints,’ says Ermann, and very frequently cramping, accelerated pulse rate, and chronic pain.

— Ulrike Demmer, Spiegel Online

Besides Posttraumatic Stress Disorder (PTSD) – which many authors view as a possible consequence of war – Ermann added "latent symptoms" which he had identified in preparation for his research project: "Many still have nightmares of attacks, traps, violence, struggle, escape. Others are torn from sleep with an ancient feeling for which they have a personal formula: 'The Russians are coming'. Others experience depression, low confidence, anxiety, somatization or conversion. There are sometimes strange symptoms: feeling cold or recurring fever, agitation and restlessness or sudden panic, numbness, or the feeling of being out of control. Today we recognize in such symptoms the traces of flight-or-fight responses, recurring memories that express themselves in the body, memories of the incomprehensible." For decades, before the development of the trauma concept, all of these symptoms have been traditionally described as "hysterical desire neurosis" or they were traced to "hereditary vulnerability".

One year after the Frankfurt Congress in 2005, psychoanalyst Luise Reddemann addressed her younger colleagues during a lecture regarding therapeutic consequences:

Finally, I would like to ask the younger listeners in this audience to please remember that when you work with people who were born between 1930 and 1945 that these people could have been traumatized as children. It might be that the symptoms of these people have their roots in the war. [...] Consider, for example, that sleep disturbances, memory disorders, and somatization disorder can be consequences of war-related experiences. Age-related helplessness, but also 'retirement' – and therefore less distraction due to work issues – can bring the unprocessed trauma back closer to the surface of consciousness and lead to symptoms. In addition, many of the war children have suffered from these symptoms for a long time because they have not taken them seriously due to internalized bravery.

— Luise Reddemann, Bad Krozingen 2006

In 2015, Luise Reddemann's book about psychotherapy regarding children of war and grandchildren of war was published. There she addressed the question of how the consequences of a childhood during war can be recognized and dealt with in detail.

=== War children in old age ===
Ermann contributes, among other reasons, the fact that this topic is "researched and debated" 70 years later to the age of war children. He states that "neuro-physiological processes" are making memories "that have been hidden for a long time re-appear". He is stating further that "psychological defences collapse" as a result of age, and "everything that has been protective for decades – a person's family and job – disappears".

The second interdisciplinary congress about war children took place in Münster in 2013, eight years after the first one. Among the many topics discussed, the age of the war children was addressed as well. If "life experience – beyond all research – teaches that remembering characterizes old age", Insa Fooken, a German professor focusing on aging, confirmed this general knowledge from the perspective of developmental psychology. "It is often not until old age that the full extent of the consequences becomes visible."

In summary, the late occurrence or deterioration of an existing post-traumatic symptomatology at a mature age was demonstrated in various research studies. There is, however, the risk that the post-traumatic symptoms are not recognized and misinterpreted as age-related depression or somatic symptoms.

— Andrea Bauer, Dissertation 2009

Radebold, as Ermann, has researched war children and specializes in the psychotherapy of the elderly. He wondered how the war children would cope "when they become older, eventually needing care or support, and thus having to give up their independence". He reminded "professional groups working in psycho-social and old-age related fields" of the urgent need to "provide updated knowledge and information".

Take, for example, old-age and nursing homes. There you will always experience the following situation: In her room, an old woman is cared for at night by two young men – intimate care, wet panties, etc. The woman bites and screams and lashes about, re-experiencing sexual assault.

— Hartmut Radebold, Interview 2010

In 2013, German broadcaster ARD presented a documentary by Dorothe Dörholt about war children in old age. Journalist Thilo Wydra titled this programme in the German newspaper Tagesspiegel Unforgettable, Unprocessed: The Fear in One's Head. German TV station Phönix broadcast a rerun in 2015, focusing on the return of traumatizing experiences in old age: "One third of German pensioners was seriously traumatized during the war. Many of them are helplessly exposed to images and memories of war which are reappearing in old age." War-related traumata and anxiety-provoking memories are now being addressed in old age homes. "Historical knowledge" is necessary and "not leaving old people alone or lonely" – is the belief of one caregiver for the elderly. An online platform by the name Age and Trauma – Giving Space to the Unheard is addressing "elderly people, their relatives, professionals and institutions" by embracing the trauma of old people in general and the war children of the Second World War specifically, recognizing that time does not heal all wounds. The project Old People and Traumata – Understanding, Testing and Multiplication of Interventions and Training Opportunities, was funded by the Ministry of Health, Emancipation, Care and Old Age of the State of North Rhine-Westphalia, Germany, between 2013 and 2016.

== Organizations, groups, and websites ==
The more the topic war children became public, the more organizations in several locations in Germany have been founded, focusing on this subject. Some have since disappeared, others have been launched. Probably all of them can be found on the Internet, but not every website is an organization. Some of them are self-help groups with the goal to support, promote contacts, or organize group discussions. Some are directed exclusively to war children or grandchildren of war, while others address both groups. Typically these organizations consider those born after 1950 to be the grandchildren of war, although many of them are brothers and sisters of the war children and do not belong to the next generation. Other organizations have primarily devoted themselves to the support of scientific research.

== Documentary films ==
The following films have not been translated into the English language. Their German titles, as well as the English translation of the titles in brackets, are included as references.

- 2006: Kriegskinder erinnern sich (War Children Remember). A film by Tina Soliman on behalf of the German broadcaster WDR
- 2012: Kriegskinder. Zeitzeugeninterviews on YouTube (War Children. Interviews of Witnesses). With Gisela May, Wolf Biermann, Peter Sodann, Hans Teuscher, on behalf of the Anne Frank Center
- 2012: Vater blieb im Krieg. Kindheit ohne Vater nach dem Zweiten Weltkrieg. (Father Didn't Come Back. Childhood Without a Father After the Second World War. Director: Gabriele Trost
- 2013: Wir Kriegskinder. Wie die Angst in uns weiterlebt. (Us War Children. How Our Fears Live on). A film by Dorothe Dörholt
- 2014: Reise in die heile Welt: Deutsche Kriegskinder in der Schweiz. (Journey Into an Intact World: German War Children in Switzerland). A film by Ina Held
- 2014: Fluchtwege – als jüdische Flüchtlinge in die Schweiz wollten. (Escape Routes – When Jewish Refugees Wanted to Go to Switzerland). A film by Gerd Böhmer
- 2015: Hitlers betrogene Generation. Kriegskinder in Bayern. Teil 1 (Hitler's Deceived Generation. War Children in Bavaria. Part 1). A film by Peter Prestel and Rudolf Sporrer
- 2015: Hitlers betrogene Generation. Kriegskinder in Bayern. Teil 2 (Hitler's Deceived Generation. War Children in Bavaria. Part 2). A film by Peter Prestel and Rudolf Sporrer

== Literature ==
- Ute Benz; Wolfgang Benz, eds. (1993). Sozialisation und Traumatisierung. Kinder in der Zeit des Nationalsozialismus [Socialization and Traumatization. Children During the Nazi Era] (in German). Frankfurt am Main: Fischer-Taschenbuch. ISBN 978-3-596-11067-4.
- Peter Heinl (1994). Maikäfer flieg, dein Vater ist im Krieg... Seelische Wunden aus der Kriegskindheit [Fly Away, Ladybug, Your Father Is in the War... Psychological Scars from a Childhood During War] (in German). München: Kösel. ISBN 978-3-466-30359-5.
- Eva Jantzen; Merith Niehuss, eds. (1994). Das Klassenbuch. Chronik einer Frauengeneration 1932–1976 [The Classroom Book. Chronicle of a Generation of Women 1932–1976] (in German). Weimar, Köln, Wien: Böhlau. ISBN 978-3-412-12093-1.
- Roberts, Ulla (1994). Starke Mütter – ferne Väter. Töchter reflektieren ihre Kindheit im Nationalsozialismus und in der Nachkriegszeit [Strong Mothers – Distant Fathers. Daughters Reflect on Their Childhood in the Eras of National Socialism and the Post-War Period] (in German). Frankfurt am Main: Fischer-Taschenbuch. ISBN 978-3-596-11075-9.
- Sigrid Chamberlain (1997). Adolf Hitler, die deutsche Mutter und ihr erstes Kind. Über zwei NS-Erziehungsbücher [Adolf Hitler, the German Mother, and Her First Child] (in German). Gießen: Psychosozial. ISBN 978-3-930096-58-9.
- Wolfgang Schmidbauer (1998). «Ich wußte nie, was mit Vater ist». Das Trauma des Krieges ["I Never Knew about Father." The Trauma of War] (in German). Reinbek bei Hamburg: Rowohlt. ISBN 978-3-498-06331-3.
- Michael Ermann (2004). Wir Kriegskinder [Us War Children] (in German). pp. 226–239.
- Sabine Bode (2004). Die vergessene Generation – Die Kriegskinder brechen ihr Schweigen [The Forgotten Generation – The War Children Are Breaking Their Silence] (in German). Stuttgart: Klett-Cotta. ISBN 3-608-94800-7.
- Hartmut Radebold (2005). Die dunklen Schatten unserer Vergangenheit. Ältere Menschen in Beratung, Psychotherapie, Seelsorge und Pflege [The Dark Shadows of Our Past. Older People Receiving Counseling, Psychotherapy, Spiritual Guidance and Care] (in German). Stuttgart: Klett-Cotta. ISBN 978-3-608-94162-3.
- Hartmut Radebold; Gereon Heuft; Insa Fooken, eds. (2006). Kindheiten im Zweiten Weltkrieg. Kriegserfahrungen und deren Folgen aus psychohistorischer Perspektive [Childhood in the Second World War. War Experiences and Their Consequences from a Psycho-Historical Perspective] (in German). Weinheim, München: Juventa. ISBN 978-3-7799-1730-4.
- Götz Aly (2008). Unser Kampf 1968 [Our Struggle 1968] (in German). Frankfurt, M.: S. Fischer. ISBN 978-3-10-000421-5.
- Wibke Bruhns (2009). Meines Vaters Land. Geschichte einer deutschen Familie [My Father's Country. History of a German Family] (in German). Berlin: List. ISBN 978-3-548-60899-0.
- Lu Seegers; Jürgen Reulecke, eds. (2009). Die "Generation der Kriegskinder". Historische Hintergründe und Deutungen [The "Generation of the War Children". Historical Background and Interpretations] (in German). Gießen: Psychosozial. ISBN 978-3-89806-855-0.
