= Japanese orphans in China =

Japanese children left behind in WWII

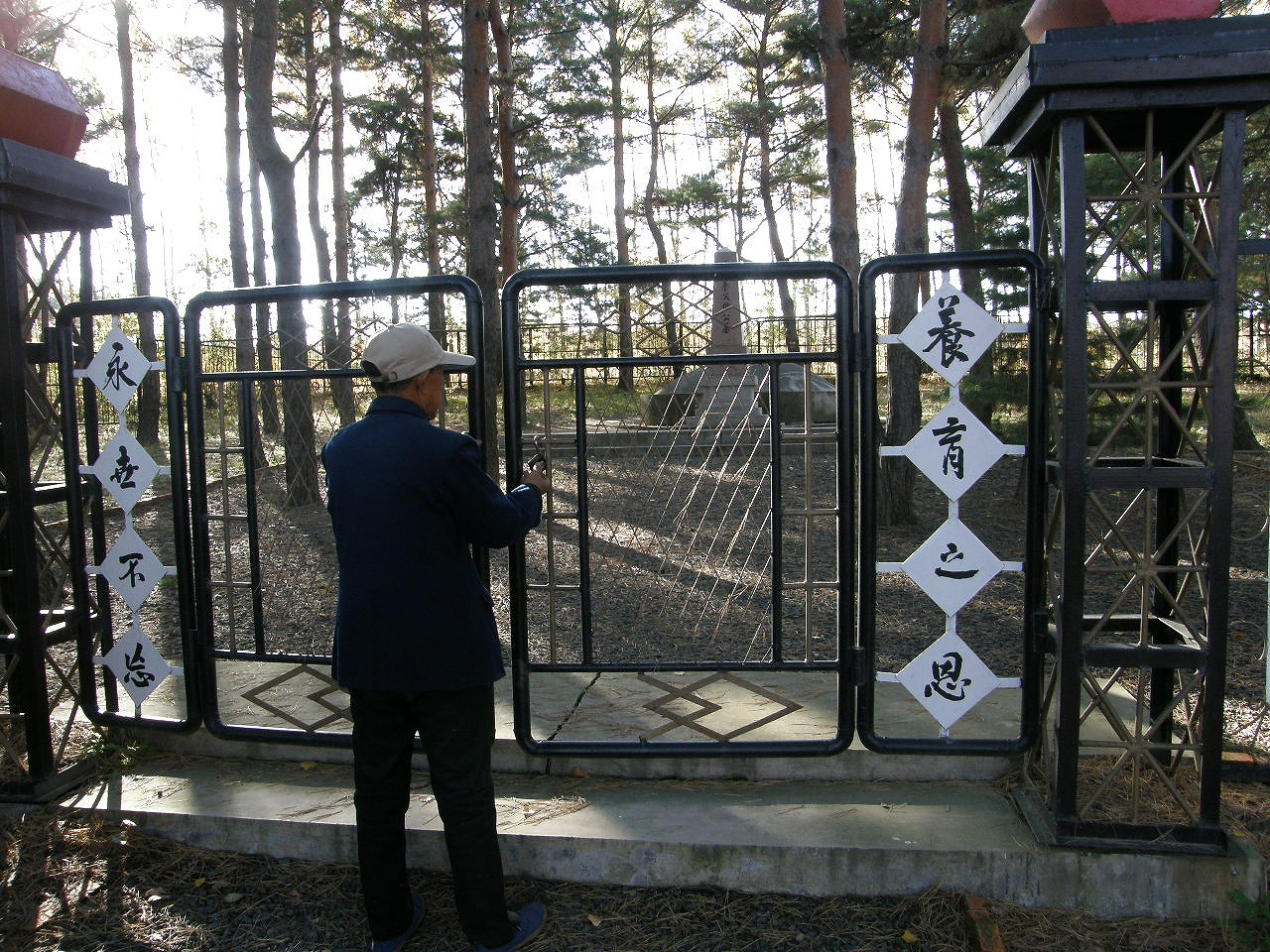
Gate of a cemetery for Japanese orphans in Fangzheng County, Harbin, Heilongjiang

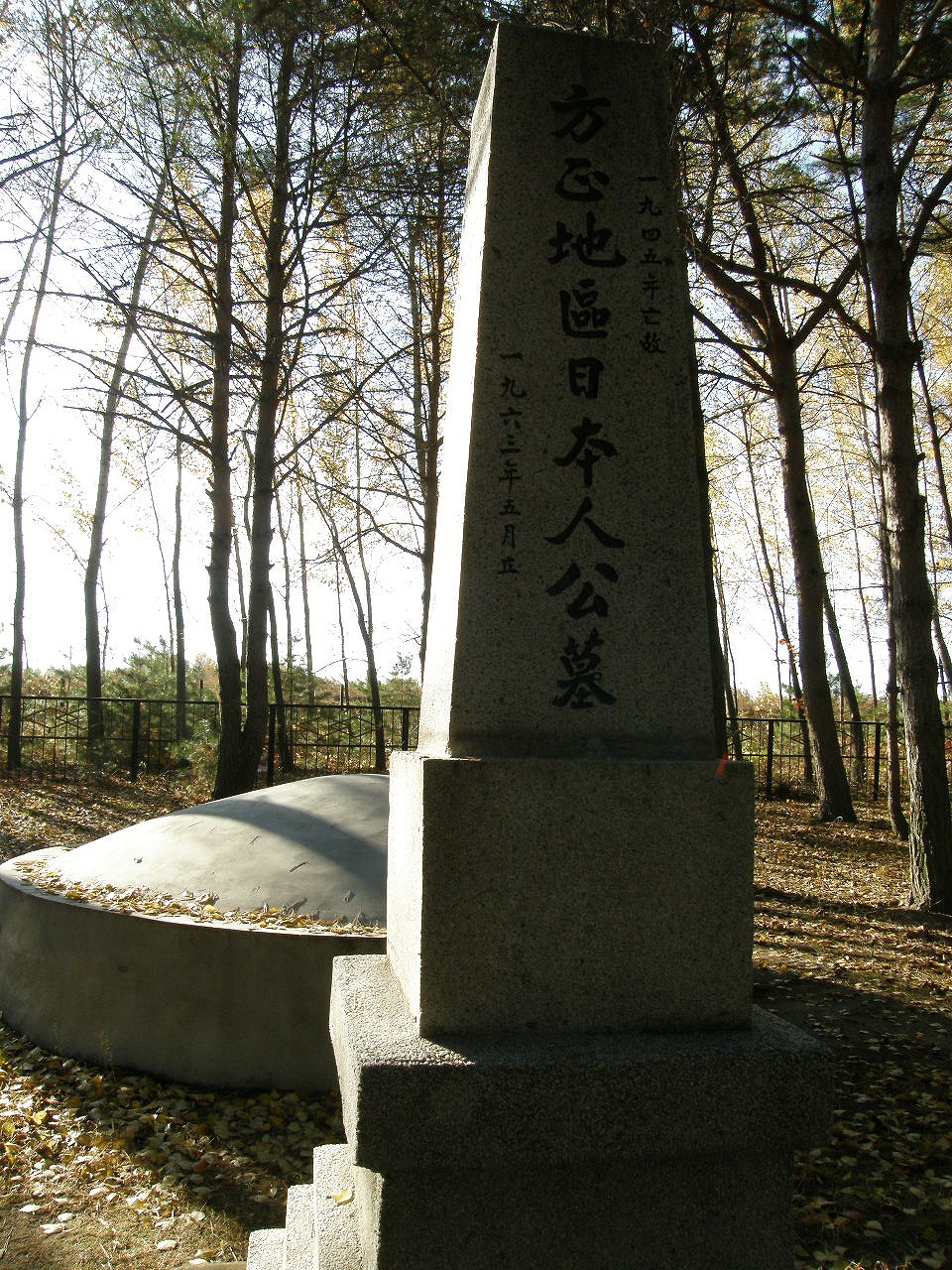
Inside the cemetery

Japanese orphans in China (Chinese: 遺華日僑, Japanese: 中国残留日本人) consist primarily of children left behind by Japanese families following the Japanese repatriation from Huludao in the aftermath of World War II. According to Chinese government figures, roughly 4,000 Japanese children were left behind in China after the war, 90% in Inner Mongolia and northeast China (then Manchukuo). They were adopted by rural Chinese families.

In 1980, the orphans began returning to Japan, but they faced discrimination due to their lack of Japanese language skills and encountered difficulties in maintaining steady employment. As of August 2004, 2,476 orphans had settled in Japan, according to the figures of the Japanese Ministry of Labor. They receive monthly payments of ¥20,000-30,000 yen from the Japanese government. In 2003, 612 orphans filed a lawsuit against the Japanese government, claiming that it bears responsibility for their having been left behind. Each plaintiff sought ¥33 million.

Besides the orphans, most other Japanese left behind in China were women. These Japanese women mostly married Chinese men and became known as "stranded war wives" (zanryu fujin/殘留婦人). Because they had children with Chinese men, the women were not allowed to bring their Chinese families back with them to Japan, and most of them stayed. Japanese law allowed only children with Japanese fathers to become Japanese citizens.

== See also ==
- Wolf children, name given to a group of orphaned German children at the end of World War II
