= Evacuation of East Prussia =

State-ordered displacement

- Part of German evacuation from Central and Eastern Europe during World War II
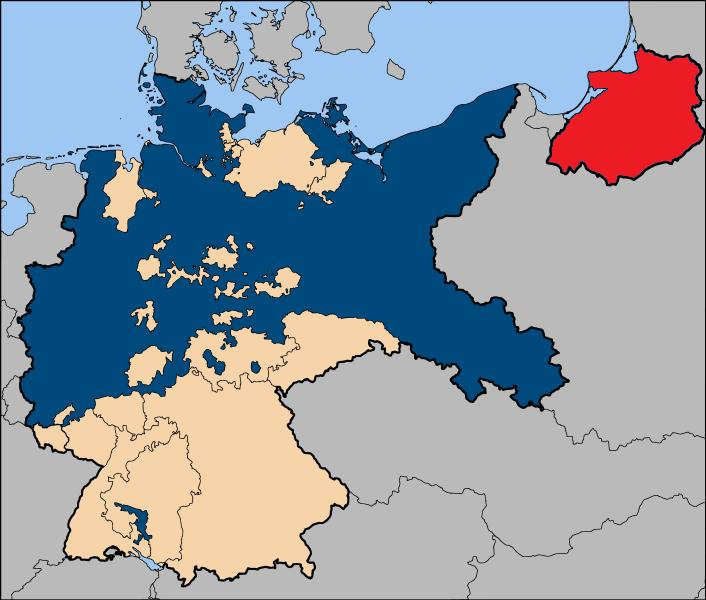
- East Prussia (red) was separated from Germany and Prussia proper (blue) by the Polish corridor in the inter-war era. The area, divided between the Soviet Union and Poland in 1945, is 340 km east of the present-day Polish–German border.
| Date | January–March 1945 |
| Location | East Prussia and Memel |
| Result | Evacuation of 2 million, out of 2.653 million civilians |

Belligerents
| Germany | Soviet Union |

Commanders and leaders
| Gauleiter Erich Koch | Ivan Chernyakhovsky; Aleksandr Vasilevsky |

Casualties and losses
- 75,000–100,000 civilians

German civilian population and military personnel were evacuated from East Prussia between 20 January and March 1945. The evacuation was initially organized and carried out by state authorities but quickly turned into a chaotic flight from the Red Army.

A part of the evacuation of German civilians towards the end of World War II, these events are not to be confused with the expulsion from East Prussia that followed after the war had ended. The area that was evacuated was not the Gau East Prussia, but the inter-war East Prussia where most people already held German citizenship. German citizens in Memel and other regions with proximity to East Prussia also took part in the evacuation, wishing to escape by sea, even though in their regions there was no official evacuation announced.

The evacuation, which had been delayed for months, was initiated due to fear of the Red Army advances during the East Prussian Offensive. Some parts of the evacuation were planned as a military necessity, Operation Hannibal being the most important military operation involved in the evacuation. However, many refugees took to the roads on their own initiative because of reported Soviet atrocities against Germans in the areas under Soviet control. Both spurious and factual accounts of Soviet atrocities were disseminated through the official news and propaganda outlets of Nazi Germany and by rumors that swept through the military and civilian populations.

Despite having detailed evacuation plans for some areas, the German authorities, including the Gauleiter of East Prussia, Erich Koch, delayed action until 20 January, when it was too late for an orderly evacuation, and the civil services and Nazi Party were eventually overwhelmed by the numbers of those wishing to evacuate. Coupled with the panic caused by the speed of the Soviet advance, civilians caught in the middle of combat, and the bitter winter weather, many thousands of refugees died during the evacuation period. The Soviet forces took control of East Prussia only in May 1945. According to the West German Schieder commission, the civilian population of East Prussia at the beginning of 1944 was 2,653,000 people. This accounting, which was based on ration cards, included air raid evacuees from western Germany and foreign workers. Before the end of the war an estimated 2 million people were evacuated, including 500,000 in late 1944 and 1,500,000 after January 1945. An estimated 600,000 remained behind in Soviet-controlled East Prussia in April–May 1945.

The West German search service reported that 31,940 civilians from East Prussia, which also included Memel, were confirmed as killed during the evacuation.

== Propaganda ==
=== German ===
The Red Army initiated an offensive into East Prussia in October 1944, but it was temporarily driven back two weeks later. After that, the German Ministry of Propaganda reported that war crimes had taken place in East Prussian villages, in particular in Nemmersdorf, where inhabitants had been raped and killed by the advancing Soviets. Since the Nazi war effort had largely stripped the civil population of able-bodied men for service in the military, the victims of the atrocity were primarily old men, women, and children. Upon the Soviet withdrawal from the area, German authorities sent in film crews to document what had happened, and invited foreign observers as further witnesses. A documentary film from the footage obtained during this effort was put together and shown in cinemas in East Prussia, with the intention of bolstering civilian and military resolve in resisting the Soviets. A Nazi information campaign about the atrocities at Nemmersdorf, as well as other crimes committed in East Prussia, convinced the remaining civilians that they must not get caught by the advancing enemy.

=== Soviet ===
Murders of Axis prisoners of war and German civilians are known from cases at Soviet military tribunals. Also, when Soviet troops moved into East Prussia, large numbers of enslaved Ostarbeiter ("Eastern workers") were freed, and knowledge of the suffering and deaths of many of these workers hardened the attitude of many Soviet soldiers towards East Prussians.

Lev Kopelev, who took part in the invasion of East Prussia, sharply criticized atrocities against the German civilian population. For this he was arrested in 1945 and sentenced to a ten-year term in the Gulag for "bourgeois humanism" and for "pity for the enemy". Aleksandr Solzhenitsyn also served in East Prussia in 1945 and was arrested for criticizing Joseph Stalin and Soviet crimes in private correspondence with a friend. Solzhenitsyn was sentenced to an eight-year term in a labor camp. Of the atrocities, Solzhenitsyn wrote: "You know very well that we've come to Germany to take our revenge" for German atrocities committed in the Soviet Union.

== Evacuation ==
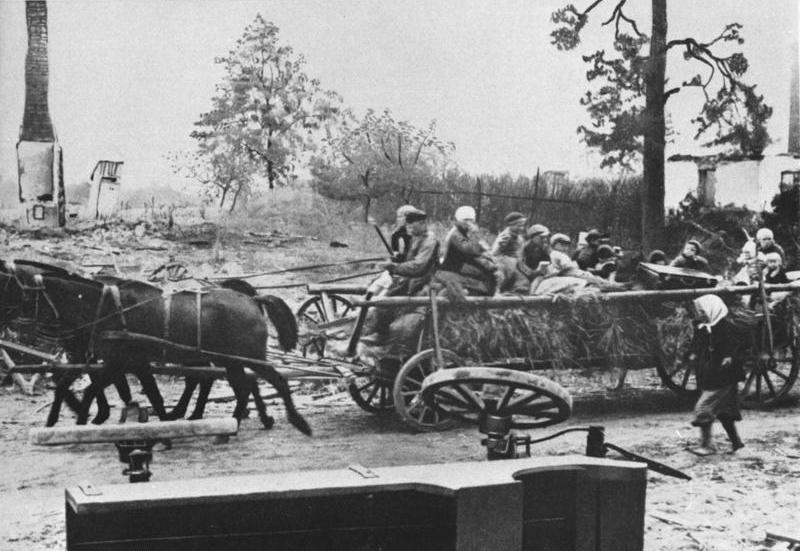
East Prussian refugees

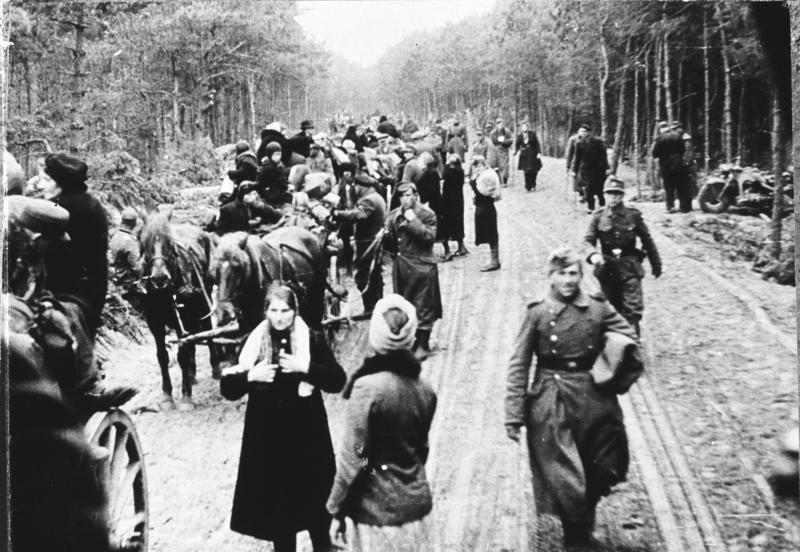
Refugees

The evacuation plans for parts of East Prussia were ready in the second half of 1944. They consisted of both general plans and specific instructions for many towns. The plans encompassed not only civilians, but also industry and livestock.

Initially, Erich Koch, the Gauleiter of East Prussia, forbade evacuation of civilians (until 20 January 1945), and ordered that civilians trying to flee the region without permission should be instantly shot. Any kind of preparations made by civilians were treated as defeatism and "Wehrkraftzersetzung" (undermining of military morale). Koch and many other Nazi functionaries were among the first to flee during the Soviet advance. Between 12 January and mid-February 1945, almost 8.5 million Germans fled the Eastern provinces of the Reich. Most of the refugees were women and children forced to use improvised means of transport such as wooden farm wagons and carts, as all the motorized vehicles and fuel had been confiscated by the Wehrmacht at the beginning of the war. Travel was difficult as military transports and convoys clogged roads and bridges.

After the Red Army reached the coast of the Vistula Lagoon near Elbing on 23 January 1945, cutting off the overland route between East Prussia and the western territories, the only way to leave was to cross the frozen Vistula Lagoon to reach the harbours of Danzig or Gotenhafen to be evacuated by ships taking part in Operation Hannibal. Mingled with retreating Wehrmacht units, and without any camouflage or shelter, the refugees were attacked by Soviet bombers and fighter aircraft. Many wagons broke through the bomb-riddled ice covering the brackish water. Prize horses and caretakers from the Trakehner stud farms were evacuated with the wagon trains, and a considerable number were lost.

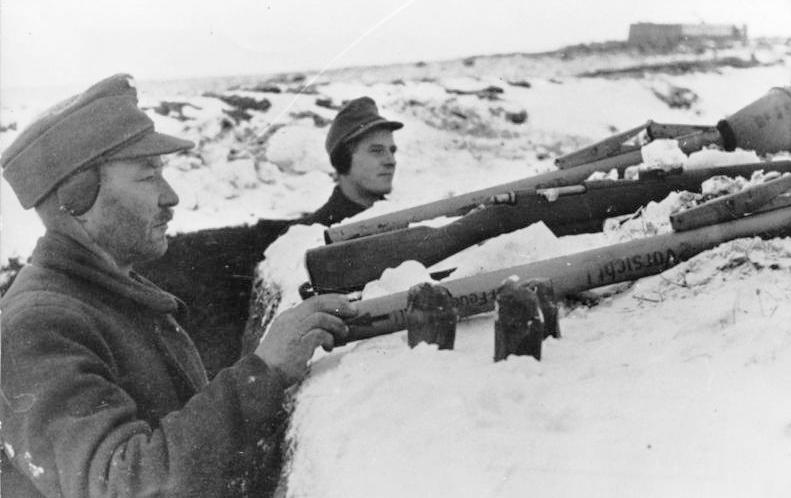
Volkssturm in East Prussia

Any remaining men aged 16–60 were immediately incorporated into the Volkssturm, but such units were poorly supervised and prone to desertion as members realized the futility of fighting Soviet troops without adequate training or weapons. Refugee trains leaving East Prussia were also extremely crowded, and due to the very low temperatures, children often froze to death during the journey. The last refugee train left Königsberg on 22 January 1945.

Berlin military writer Antony Beevor wrote, in Berlin: The Downfall (2002), that:

Martin Bormann, the Reichsleiter of the National Socialist Party, whose Gauleiters had in most cases stopped the evacuation of women and children until it was too late, never mentions in his diary those fleeing in panic from the eastern regions. The incompetence with which they handled the refugee crisis is chilling, yet in the case of the Nazi hierarchy it is often hard to tell where irresponsibility ended and inhumanity began.

=== Operation Hannibal ===
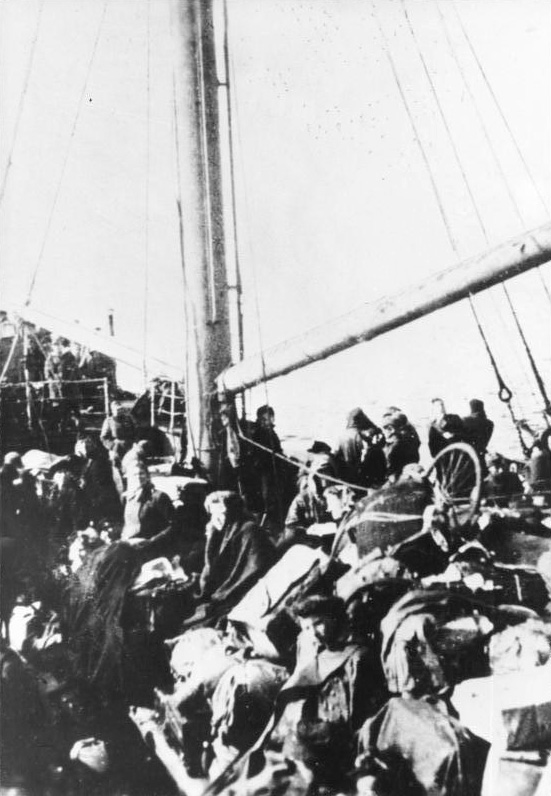
Refugees on a ship near Pillau

Operation Hannibal was a military operation that started on 21 January 1945, on the orders of Admiral Karl Dönitz, withdrawing German troops and civilians from Courland, East Prussia, and the Polish Corridor. The flood of refugees turned the operation into one of the largest emergency evacuations by sea in history – over a period of 15 weeks, somewhere between 494 and 1,080 merchant vessels of all types and numerous naval craft, including Germany's largest remaining naval units, transported about 800,000–900,000 refugees and 350,000 soldiers across the Baltic Sea to Germany and occupied Denmark. This evacuation was one of the Kriegsmarine's most significant activities during the war.

The greatest recorded loss of life from a ship sinking occurred during this operation, when the transport ship Wilhelm Gustloff was hit by three torpedoes from the Soviet submarine S-13 in the Baltic Sea on the night of 30 January 1945. She sank in under 45 minutes; figures for the number of deaths vary from 5,348, to 7,000 or 9,400. The 949 survivors were rescued by Kriegsmarine vessels led by the cruiser Admiral Hipper, although it is claimed that "the big warship could not risk heaving to, with a submarine close by". Also, on 10 February, the SS General von Steuben left Pillau with 2,680 refugees on board; it was hit by torpedoes just after departure, killing almost all aboard.

== Königsberg ==
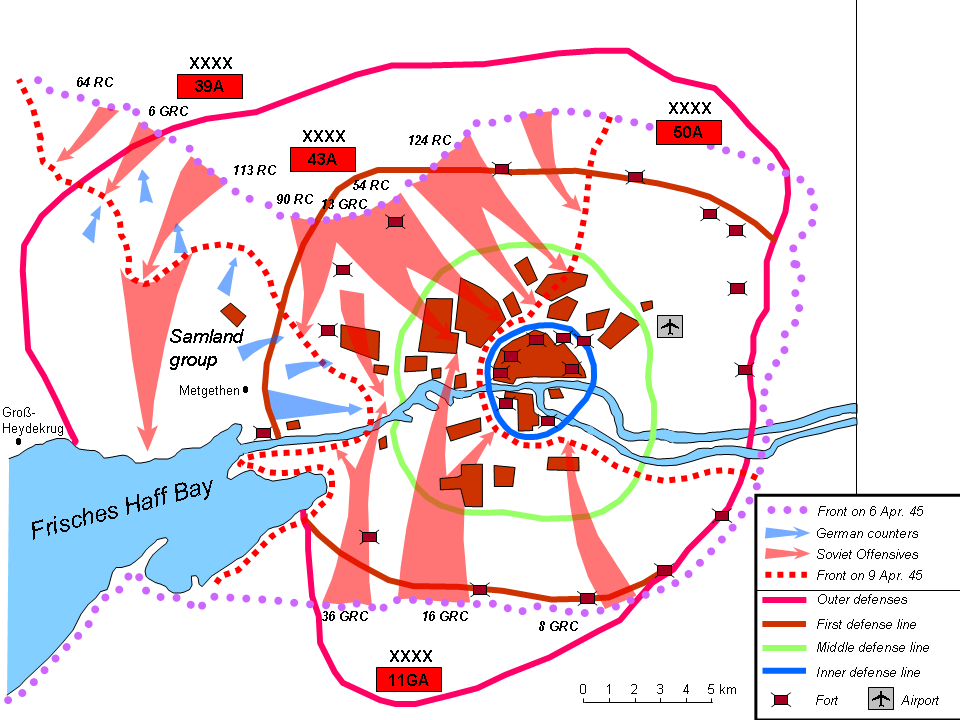
Soviet assault on Königsberg from 6 to 9 April 1945

On 24 January 1945, the 3rd Belorussian Front, led by General Chernyakhovsky, surrounded the capital city of East Prussia, Königsberg. The 3rd Panzer Army and around 200,000 civilians were trapped inside the city. In response to this, General Georg-Hans Reinhardt, commander of the Army Group Center, warned Hitler of the imminent Soviet threat, but the Führer refused to act. Due to the rapid approach of the 2nd Belorussian Front led by General Rokossovsky, Nazi authorities in Königsberg decided to send trains full of refugees to Allenstein, without knowing that the town had already been captured by the Soviet 3rd Guards Cavalry Corps.

During the Soviet assault, the Frische Nehrung spit became the last means of escape to the west. However, civilians who tried to escape along the spit were often intercepted and killed by Soviet tanks and patrols. Two thousand civilians left Königsberg every day and tried to reach the already crowded town of Pillau. The final Soviet assault on Königsberg started on 2 April with a heavy bombardment of the city. The land route to Pillau was once again severed and those civilians who were still in the city died by the thousands. Eventually, the German garrison surrendered on 9 April, and as Beevor wrote, "the rape of women and girls went unchecked in the ruined city".

== Crimes ==
The widely publicized killings and rapes in places like Nemmersdorf by the Soviets led to a severe degree of fear in the entire German population of East Prussia. Soviet troops had no qualms about firing on unarmed and helpless refugees. Whole families were murdered, and their homes were torched. Thefts and the looting of valuables was rampant. Zakhar Agranenko, a playwright serving as an officer of marine infantry in East Prussia, wrote:

Red Army soldiers don't believe in "individual liaisons" with German women. Nine, ten, twelve men at a time – they rape them on a collective basis.

Even Russian women liberated from forced labor camps were raped by Soviet soldiers. The rear-guard units of the advancing Soviet armies were responsible for a large proportion of the crimes committed by Red Army personnel. Soviet officers like Lev Kopelev, who tried to prevent crimes, were accused of pity for the enemy and became Gulag prisoners.

These acts of violence were influenced by a desire for revenge and retribution for crimes committed by the Nazis during their invasion of the Soviet Union, collectively driven by Soviet propaganda. The propaganda was a purposeful goad to the Soviet soldier and reflected the will of the political authorities in the Soviet Union right up to Stalin. There is no question that Stalin was aware of what was happening. Given the strict control of the Communist party over the military hierarchy, the pillage and rape in Prussia was the result of the Soviet command at all levels. Only when Stalin saw that it was in the Soviet Union's interests to check the behaviour of the Red Army did he take steps to stop it.

== Aftermath ==
Germany's territorial losses after World War II highlighted in green and pink

The Red Army eliminated all pockets of resistance and took control of East Prussia in May 1945. The exact number of civilian dead has never been determined, but is estimated to be at least 300,000. However, most of the German inhabitants, which at that point consisted mainly of children, women, and old men, did escape the Red Army as part of the largest exodus of people in human history. Antony Beevor said:

A population which had stood at 2.2 million in 1940 was reduced to 193,000 at the end of May 1945.

The Schieder commission in 1953 estimated casualties in the 1945 campaign at 30,000 civilian dead in East Prussia, and overall civilian losses in the entire Oder–Neisse region at 75–100,000.

The West German Statistisches Bundesamt figures from 1958 estimated total civilian losses in East Prussia of 299,200 including 274,200 in the expulsions after May 1945 and 25,000 during the war. According to the Statistisches Bundesamt, in total, out of a pre-war population of 2,490,000, about 500,000 died during the war, including 210,000 military dead and 311,000 civilians dying during the wartime flight, postwar expulsion of Germans and forced labor in the Soviet Union; 1,200,000 managed to escape to the western parts of Germany, while about 800,000 pre-war inhabitants remained in East Prussia in summer 1945. The figure of 311,000 civilian deaths is included in the overall estimate of 2.2 million expulsion deaths that is often cited in historical literature.

The West German search service issued its final report in 1965 detailing the losses of the German civilian population due to the flight and expulsions. The West German government authorized its release in 1986, and a summary of the findings was published in 1987 by the German scholar de:Gert von Pistohlkors. According to the West German search service, the civilian population of East Prussia (including Memel) before the flight and expulsions was 2,328,947. They put civilian dead and missing at 514,176 persons. The number of confirmed dead was 123,360 (9,434 violent deaths, 736 suicides, 9,864 deportation deaths, 7,841 in internment camps, 31,940 deaths during the wartime flight, 22,308 during the expulsions and 41,237 from unknown causes). There were an additional 390,816 cases of persons reported missing whose fate could not be clarified. Some historians in Germany maintain that the search service figures of confirmed dead provide a realistic view of the total losses due to the flight and expulsions; they believe that the cases of persons reported missing whose fate could not be clarified are unreliable. The German historian Rüdiger Overmans maintains that the statistical foundations of the West German government search service report to be unreliable; he believes that new research on the number of expulsion deaths is needed. However, the German government and the German Red Cross still maintain that the higher figures which include the persons reported missing whose fate could not be clarified are correct.

The German Federal Archives estimated that about 1% (100–120,000 of the estimated 11–12 million total German civilian population) in the Oder–Neisse region lost their lives due to military activity in the 1944–45 campaign as well as deliberate killings by Soviet forces.

According to other sources, in summer 1945 about 800,000 Germans were still living in East Prussia. The Red Army's brutality towards civilians during the East Prussian campaign, coupled with years of Nazi propaganda regarding the Soviet Union, led many German soldiers on the Eastern Front to believe that "there could be no purpose in surviving Soviet victory". This belief motivated many German soldiers to continue fighting even though they believed that the war was lost, and this contributed to higher Soviet casualties.

Most Germans who were not evacuated during the war were expelled from East Prussia and the other former German territories east of the Oder-Neisse line in the years immediately after the end of World War II, as agreed to by the Allies at the Potsdam Conference, because, in the words of Winston Churchill:

Expulsion is the method which, in so far as we have been able to see, will be the most satisfactory and lasting. There will be no mixture of populations to cause endless trouble. A clean sweep will be made.

After World War II, as also agreed at the Potsdam Conference (which met from 17 July until 2 August 1945), all of the area east of the Oder-Neisse line, whether recognized by the international community as part of Germany before 1933 or occupied by Germany during World War II, was placed under the jurisdiction of other countries. The relevant paragraph regarding East Prussia in the Potsdam Agreement is:

V. City of Koenigsberg and the adjacent area.

The Conference examined a proposal by the Soviet Government to the effect that pending the final determination of territorial questions at the peace settlement, the section of the western frontier of the Union of Soviet Socialist Republics which is adjacent to the Baltic Sea should pass from a point on the eastern shore of the Bay of Danzig to the east, north of Braunsberg-Goldap, to the meeting point of the frontiers of Lithuania, the Polish Republic and East Prussia.

The Conference has agreed in principle to the proposal of the Soviet Government concerning the ultimate transfer to the Soviet Union of the City of Koenigsberg and the area adjacent to it as described above subject to expert examination of the actual frontier.

The President of the United States and the British Prime Minister have declared that they will support the proposal of the Conference at the forthcoming peace settlement.

— Potsdam Agreement

== See also ==
- Evacuation of Manchukuo
- Evacuation of Karafuto and Kuriles
- Federation of Expellees
- Landsmannschaft Ostpreußen
- March of Millions
- Wolf children
- World War II evacuation and expulsion
