= Ruth Leiserowitz =

German historian

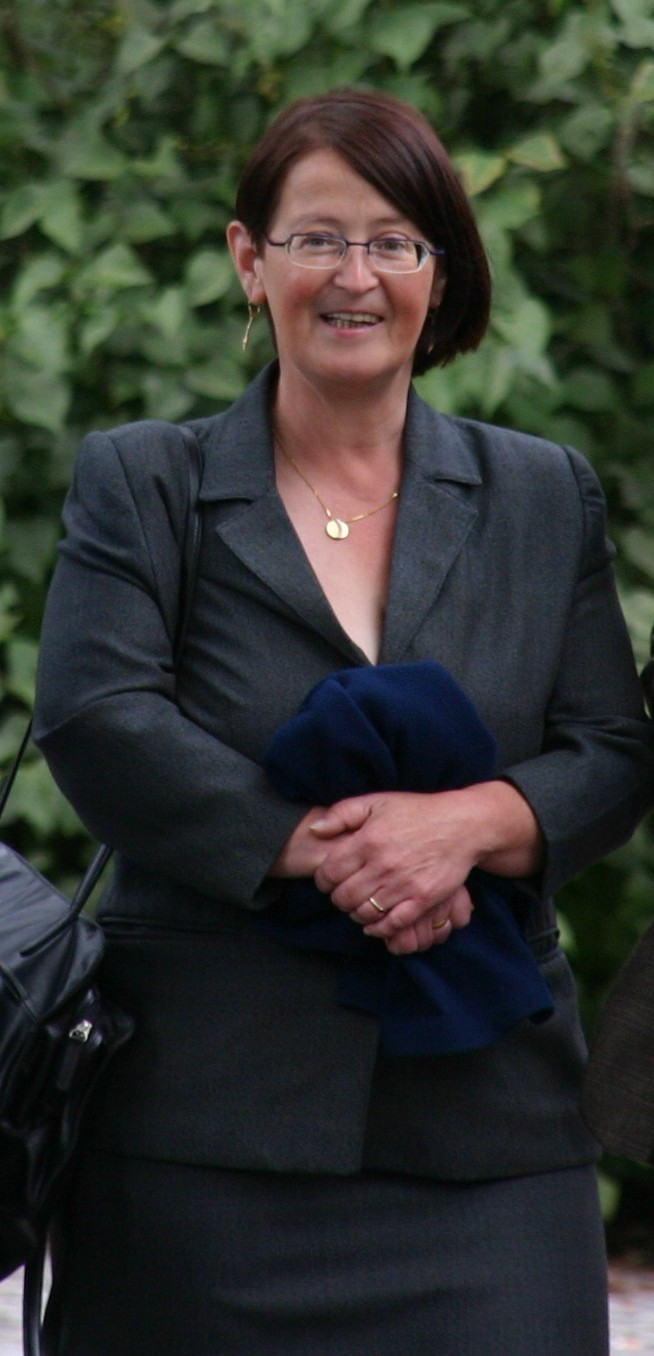
- Ruth Leiserowitz
- Born: Ruth Kibelka; 25 December 1958 (age 67); Prenzlau, Brandenburg, Germany
- Occupation: Historian

Academic background
- Education: Free University of Berlin

Academic work
- Discipline: Post-World War II German history

Ruth Leiserowitz (born Ruth Kibelka; 25 December 1958 in Prenzlau, Brandenburg) is a German historian. Her research primarily focuses on the history of Eastern Europe in the 19th and 20th centuries, as well as the history of Jews in the Baltic-Polish region and former East Prussia. From 2009 to 2024, she served as Deputy Director of the German Historical Institute in Warsaw. Since April 2025, she has been a Senior Researcher at Klaipėda University.

== Biography ==
Ruth Leiserowitz was born in 1958 in Prenzlau, a town in the Uckermark region, as Ruth Kibelka, and grew up in Löwenberg as the daughter of a Protestant pastor. After completing secondary school, she transferred to the Evangelisches Gymnasium Hermannswerder near Potsdam, where she earned her Abitur (university entrance qualification) in 1978. However, this qualification was not recognized in the GDR as sufficient for general university studies. In 1981, she successfully took another Abitur examination at the Volkshochschule Berlin Mitte. Nevertheless, she was still not granted admission to a university. Beginning in 1982, she became active in the independent peace movement in the GDR, participating, among other groups, in Frauen für den Frieden.

Kibelka taught herself Polish and Lithuanian, traveled through Eastern Bloc countries, and worked in the administration department of the Aufbau-Verlag publishing house in Berlin. Between 1987 and 1990, she worked as a freelance translator and interpreter for Lithuanian and Polish.

Following German reunification, she began studying History and Polish Studies at the Free University of Berlin and in Vilnius in 1990. She completed her studies in 1996 with the Magister (master's) degree.

Between 1996 and 2000, Ruth Kibelka lived in Klaipėda, Lithuania, where she supported the establishment of the Thomas Mann Cultural Center in nearby Nida on the Curonian Spit as a research associate. At the same time, between 1996 and 2001, she taught at the Klaipėda Research Center for Western Lithuanian and Prussian History. In 1997, she earned her doctorate (Ph.D.) in Modern and Contemporary History at Humboldt University of Berlin, with a dissertation titled The German Population between Adaptation and Expulsion North and South of the Memel River, 1945–1948, supervised by Heinrich August Winkler.

In 2000, Ruth Kibelka adopted the surname Leiserowitz upon marriage. In the following years, up until 2005, she worked on various research projects at the Universities of Potsdam, Humboldt University of Berlin, and Klaipėda. Until 2009, she also held a teaching position at Klaipėda University. Between 2005 and 2009, Leiserowitz was the project coordinator for the DFG research project Nations, Borders, Identities – The Revolutionary and Napoleonic Wars in European Experiences and Memories at the Berlin Center for Comparative History of Europe (BKVGE) at the Free University of Berlin. In 2007, she completed her habilitation at Humboldt University of Berlin’s Faculty of Philosophy. Her habilitation thesis, titled Border Experiences: Jewish Perspectives on a Prussian Periphery, was again supervised by Heinrich August Winkler.

From 2009 to 2024, she served as Deputy Director of the German Historical Institute in Warsaw, and in 2015, she was appointed adjunct professor (außerplanmäßige Professorin) at Humboldt University of Berlin. Since April 2025, she has been a Senior Researcher at the Institute of Baltic Region History and Archaeology at Klaipėda University, Lithuania.

She is married and has two sons.

== Further contributions ==
Ruth Leiserowitz contributed to the production of several ARD documentary films through research and consultancy, including Verschollen in Ostpreußen. Der lange Weg der Wolfskinder (two parts, 2002/2004) and Schlesische Märchenschlösser (two parts, 2003/2004).

In 2021, she served as a member of the expert commission tasked with implementing the German Bundestag’s resolution concerning the memorial and educational site in Berlin, commonly referred to as the "Poland Monument." The site is intended to commemorate the victims of German occupation during World War II. The German Foreign Office established a German-Polish expert commission, chaired by Ambassador Rolf Nikel, to develop recommendations for the German government on how to implement the Bundestag’s resolution.

She also served as the curator of the permanent exhibition opened in 2022 at the New Synagogue Museum in Kaliningrad, which presents the history of the Jews of Königsberg. The project was supported by funding from the German Foreign Office.

== Awards ==
In 2014, she was awarded the Cross of Merit First Class of the Order of Merit of the Federal Republic of Germany by German president Joachim Gauck.

In 2020, she was awarded the Order of the Lithuanian Grand Duke Gediminas by the President of the Republic of Lithuania, Gitanas Nausėda.

== Publications ==
- Auch wir sind Europa: zur jüngeren Geschichte und aktuellen Entwicklung des Baltikums (We are also Europe: The recent history and current development of the Baltics); 1991; ISBN 3-7466-0052-9
- Leben danach: Nordostpreussen 1986–1993 (Afterlife: East Prussia 1986–1993) (with Ann Tenno); 1995; ISBN 3-7921-0559-4
- Wolfskinder: Grenzgänger an der Memel (Wolf Children: Commuters at Memel); 1996; ISBN 3-86163-064-8
- Vilko Vaikai – kelias per Nemuną (Wolf Children: A Road Across Neman); 2000; ISBN 9955-00-014-7
- Ostpreußens Schicksalsjahre 1944–1948 (East Prussian years of fate 1944–1948); 2000; ISBN 3-351-02505-X
- Memellandbuch: Fünf Jahrzehnte Nachkriegsgeschichte (Memelland Book: Five decades of postwar history); 2002; ISBN 3-86163-128-8
- Von Ostpreußen nach Kyritz: Wolfskinder auf dem Weg nach Brandenburg (From East Prussia to Kyritz: Wolf children on the way to Brandenburg); 2003; ISBN 3-932502-33-7
- Sabbatleuchter und Kriegerverein: Juden in der ostpreußisch-litauischen Grenzregion 1812–1942 (Sabbath candlesticks and warrior clubs: Jews in the East Prussian-Lithuanian border region 1812–1942); 2010; ISBN 978-3-938400-59-3
