= Luise Reddemann =

Germany neuroscientist

Luise Reddemann was a neurologist, psychoanalyst, and specialist in psychotherapeutic medicine. At the University of Klagenfurt, Austria, she served as an honorary professor for psychotraumatology and psychological medicine. She conducted trauma-based studies to counteract weak/overactive neurotransmitters. Working at Evangelical Hospital, she created a therapy called psychodynamic-imaginative trauma therapy (PITT). This treatment benefited patients dealing with complex traumas through safety and stabilization, as well as acceptance of traumatic memories. Her works are most recognized for studies of women surviving childhood abuse and individuals who experienced World War I.

== Works ==
- Who You Were Before Trauma: The Healing Power of Imagination for Trauma Survivors by Luise Reddemann
- Long-term course in female survivors of childhood abuse after psychodynamically oriented, trauma-specific inpatient treatment: a naturalistic two-year follow-up

== Recognition ==
- Head of the clinic for psychotherapeutic and psychosomatic medicine at Evangelical Hospital in Bielefeld, Germany (1985 - 2003)
