= Worboys =

Worboys is an English surname, a variant of Warboys. Notable people with the surname include:

- Anne Eyre Worboys (1920–2007), New Zealand writer
- Emma Jane Worboys, birth name of Emma Jane Worboise or Guyton (1825–1887), English novelist
- Gavin Worboys (born 1974), English footballer
- George Worboys (born 2001), English rugby union player
- Helen Worboys, New Zealand politician
- John Worboys (born 1957), English sex offender
- Mike Worboys (born 1947), British mathematician and computer scientist
- Walter Worboys (1900–1969), Australian-born British businessman

== See also ==
- Worboys Committee, 1963 British government committee on road signage
- Warboys (surname)
