= War Childhood Museum =

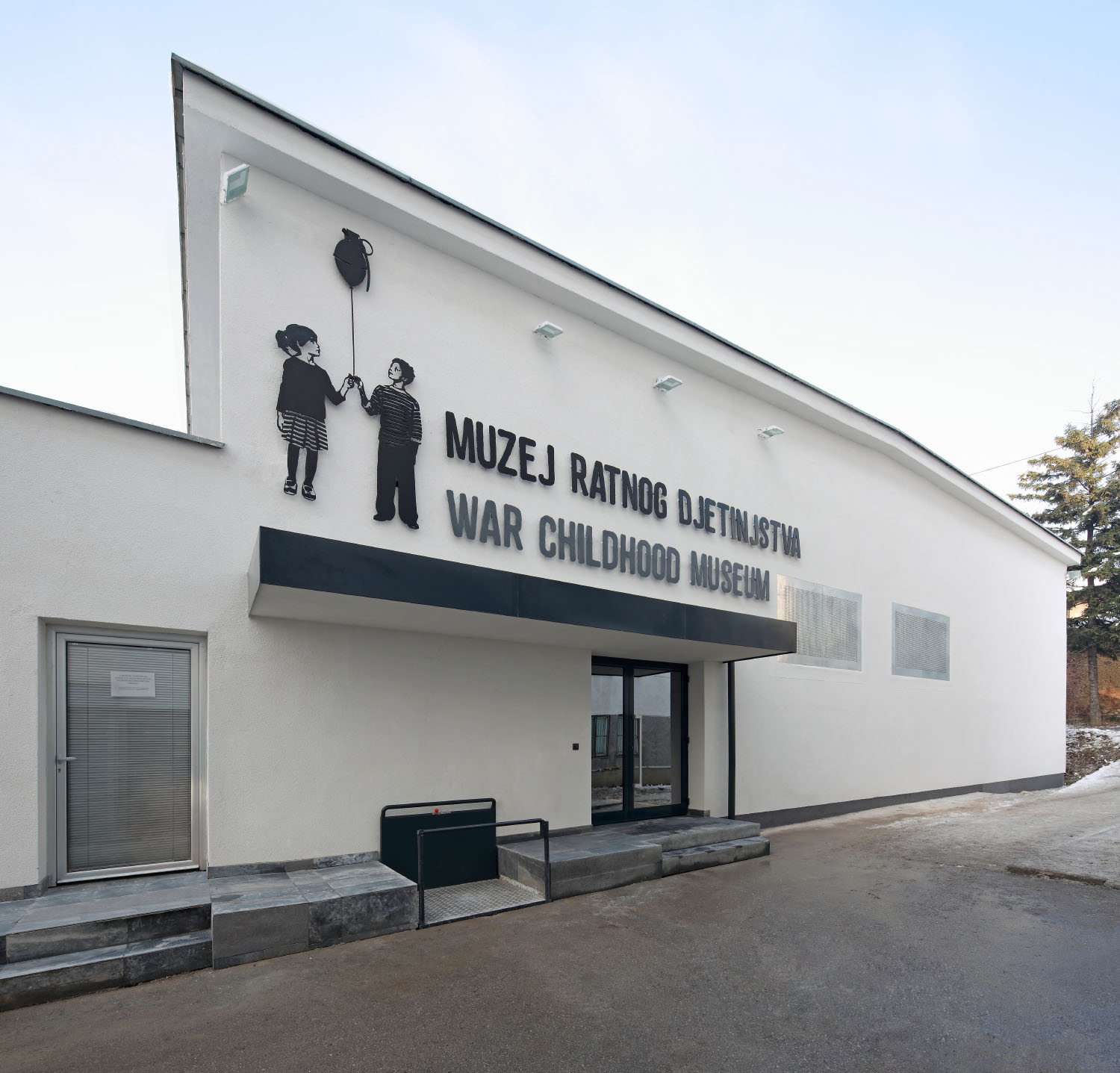
- Established: 2017
- Location: Logavina 32, Sarajevo
- Coordinates: 43.861991°N 18.428524°E
- Type: History museum
- Founder: Jasminko Halilovic
- Website: museum.warchildhood.com

The War Childhood Museum (Bosnian: Muzej ratnog djetinjstva) is a historical museum in Sarajevo, Bosnia-Herzegovina that opened in January 2017. The museum presents the experiences of children who lived through the war in Bosnia, told through objects, video testimonies, and excerpts from oral histories. The 2018 Council of Europe Museum Prize, one of the most prestigious awards in the museum industry, was awarded to the War Childhood Museum as part of the 2018 European Museum of the Year Award.

The project began in 2010 when Jasminko Halilović, a Sarajevan entrepreneur, activist, and "war child," used an online platform to collect short recollections of young adults who had been children during the Bosnian war. Over 1,000 young adults submitted their memories. Halilović assembled these recollections into a book which was published in 2013. The book has subsequently been translated into German and Japanese.

As Halilović began corresponding with the young adults who submitted memories, he realized that many of the former "war children" still had specific objects that they connected with their memories. He began working with a team of other young professionals to develop a museum collection, eventually collecting over 3,000 objects and over 60 oral history testimonies.

In May 2016, the War Childhood Museum held its first, temporary exhibition at the Historical Museum of Bosnia and Herzegovina. Further exhibitions followed in the cities of Zenica and Visoko. In January 2017, the museum’s permanent exhibition opened on Logavina Street in Sarajevo.

The museum’s collections feature diaries, toys, photographs, items of clothing, and a variety of other objects donated by war survivors. All the items are presented alongside first-person recollections from the individual who donated them. In addition to the items, visitors can listen to testimonies and read snippets from oral history interviews.

== Gallery ==
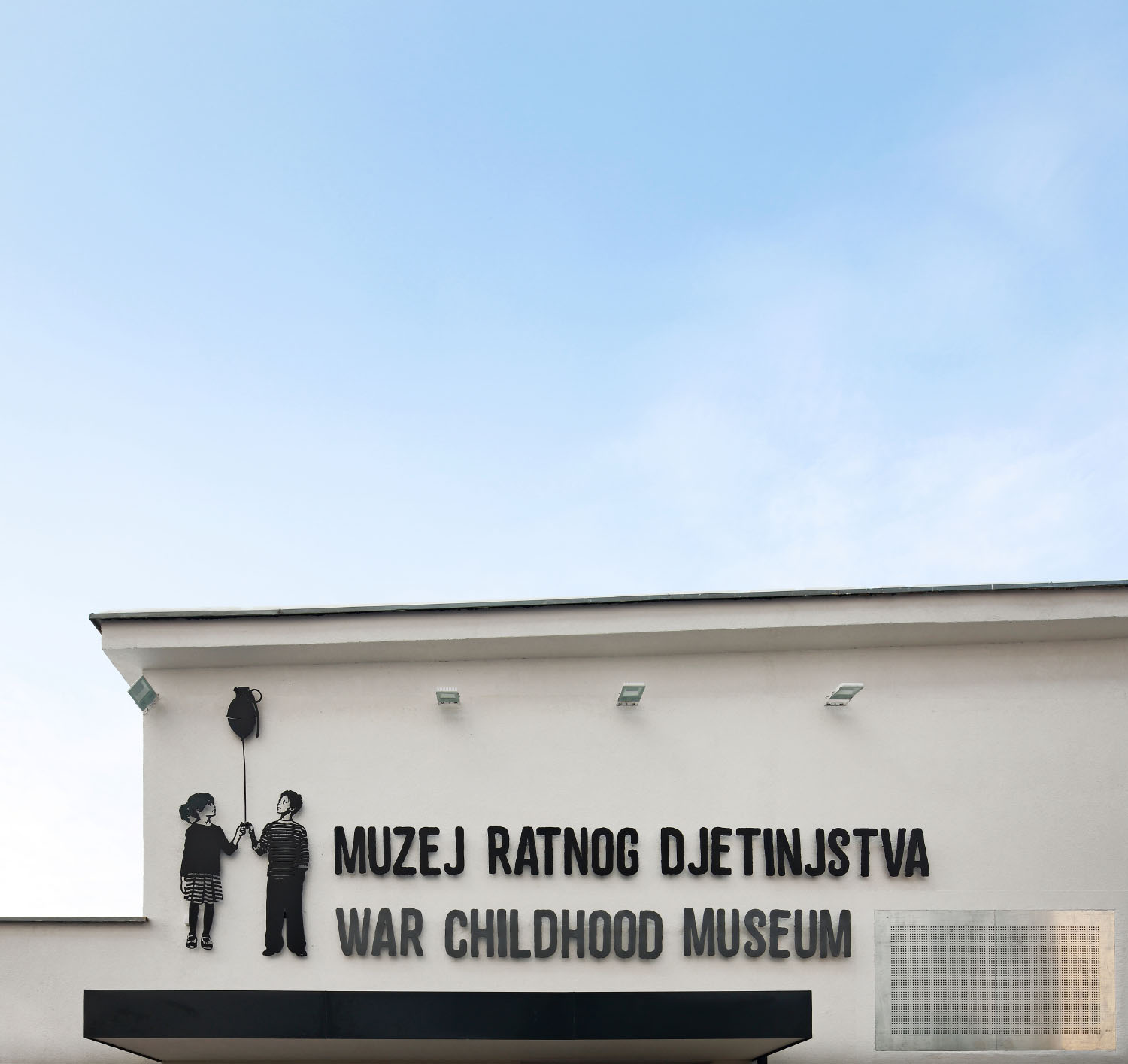

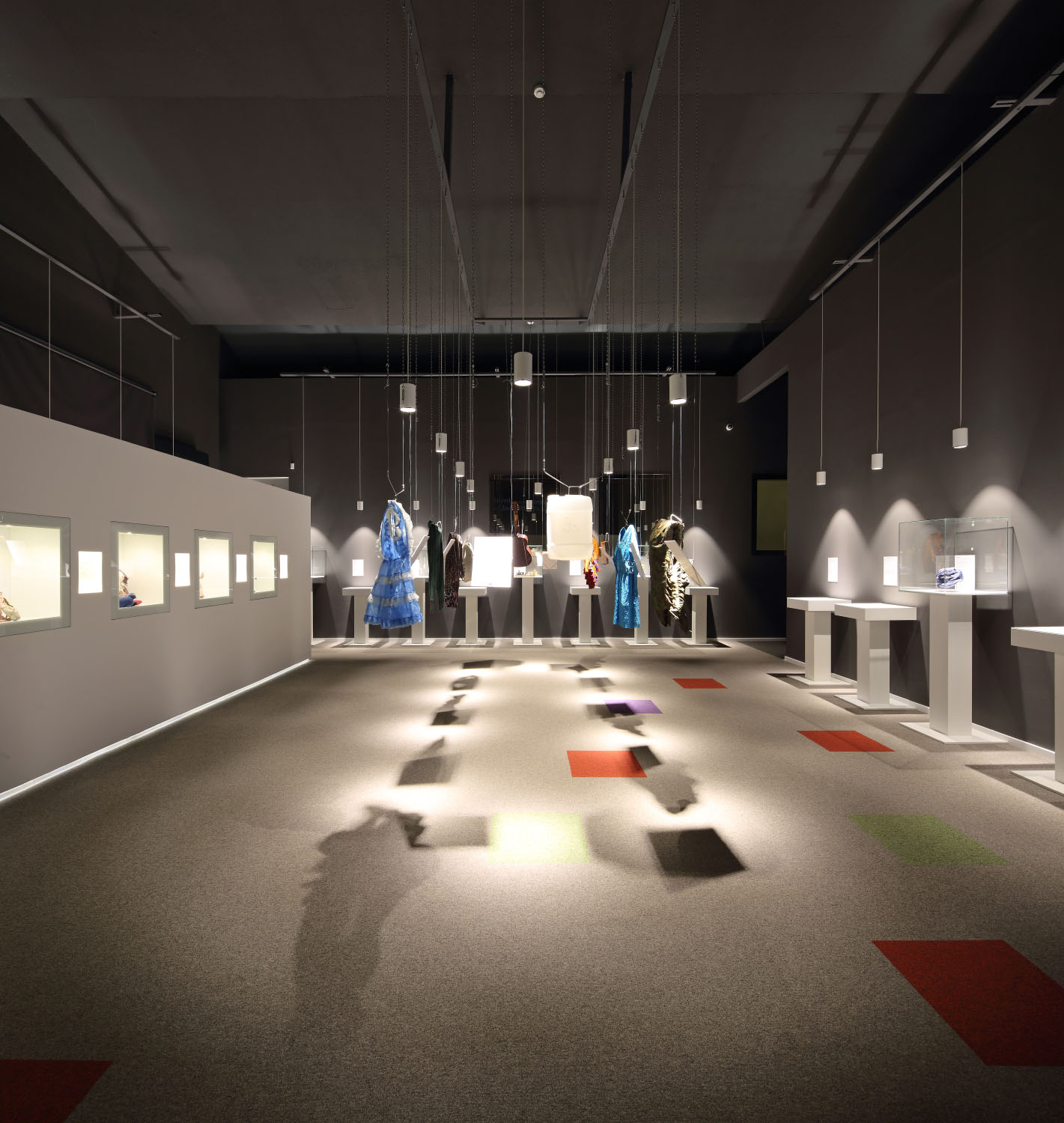

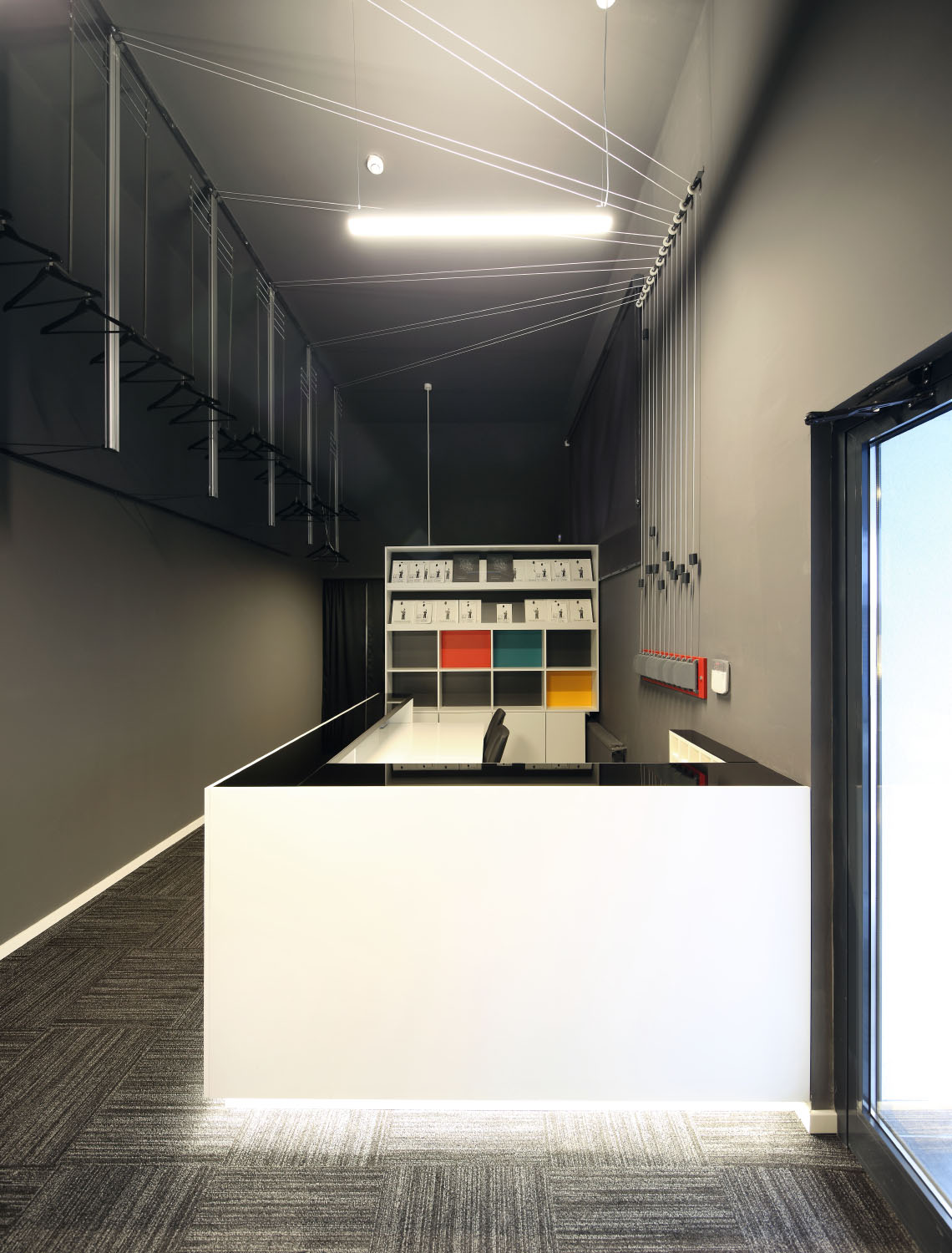
