= War baby (disambiguation) =

A war baby is a child born in a country at war.

War Baby or War Babies may also refer to:

- War Babies (Hall & Oates album), 1974
- War Babies (band), a rock band
  - War Babies (War Babies album), 1992
- War Babies (1932 film), a Shirley Temple film
- War Babies (2002 film), a Canadian documentary film
- "War Babies" (The Goodies), a 1980 episode of the British comedy television series The Goodies
- "War Baby (song)", a song by Tom Robinson
- "War Baby", a song by Mick Jagger from the album Primitive Cool
- "War Baby", a song by Roddy Ricch from the album Please Excuse Me for Being Antisocial
- War Babies, an art exhibition held at the Huysman Gallery
- "War Babies", a song by Simple Minds from the album Néapolis

== See also ==
- War Child (disambiguation)
