= Warboys (surname) =

Warboys is an English surname, originally either an occupational name for a forester, or a name given to people from Warboys, Cambridgeshire. Over time, the name has been spelt in a number of different ways, including Worboys, Worboyes and Worboise. Notable people with the surname include:

- Alan Warboys (born 1949), English footballer
- Brian Warboys (born 1942), British computer scientist
- Mrs Warboys, character in British sitcom One Foot in the Grave
