= Wolf children =

German street children in East Prussia at the end of World War II

Wolf children (German: Wolfskinder, Lithuanian: vilko vaikai, Russian: дети-волчата) or Little Germans (Lithuanian: vokietukai) were German and Prussian Lithuanian street children that existed in East Prussia at the end of World War II. Wolf children were mostly orphans left behind in the evacuation of East Prussia and Red Army invasion in early 1945, with many living homeless in the forests of East Prussia or adopted by Lithuanian families.

== Evacuation of East Prussia ==
By the end of 1944, as World War II had irreparably turned against Nazi Germany, civilians were forbidden from evacuating the eastern territory of East Prussia even as the inevitable invasion of the Red Army came closer. The Gauleiter of East Prussia, Erich Koch, gave orders that fleeing was illegal and punishable ("strenges Fluchtverbot" – flight strictly forbidden), but as the Red Army approached Königsberg many Germans prepared to evacuate anyway. In January 1945, the evacuation of East Prussia began at the last moment and flight from the territory was allowed.

The Red Army's East Prussian Offensive prompted millions of German men, women, and children to flee; however, many adults were killed or wounded during bombing raids or during harsh winters without any food or shelter. Thousands of orphaned children were left behind and fled into the surrounding forest, forced to fend for themselves and facing harsh reprisals if caught by Soviet soldiers. Condemned to live through "begging, drudging, stealing", older children often tried to keep their siblings together, and survival—searching for food and shelter—became their number-one priority.

=== Lithuanian aid ===
Many German children went on food-scrounging trips into neighboring Lithuania, where they were adopted by rural Lithuanian farmers who called them vokietukai (little Germans) and often gave them food and shelter free of charge. Most of these children made trips back and forth many times to get food for their sick mothers or siblings, travelling along railroad tracks, sometimes catching rides on top of or in between railroad cars, jumping off before reaching Soviet control stations. After the 1990s, the children were branded "wolf children" because of their wolf-like wandering through the forests. Lithuanian farmers who sold their products in the townships of East Prussia in 1946 looked for children and young people to support them in their daily work, and thus many children streamed regularly to the eastern Baltic region to receive food in exchange for products or their labor. They adopted some of the younger ones, and some of the children remained on the Lithuanian farms permanently, but exact statistics are not available. According to rough estimates, 45,000 German children and young people stayed in Lithuania in 1948.

Lithuanians who assisted the German children had to hide their efforts from the Soviet authorities, risking severe punishment if detected, with many German children's names changed, and only after the collapse of the Soviet Union in 1990 could they reveal their true identities.

Most of them became orphans by war and flight in the stage of child or baby. They had to care for themselves and find out how to survive. Many reached Lithuania, where they worked at farms to gain their living. Most had no chance for school education. A larger part never got lessons to write or read. In many cases, the children got new Lithuanian first and family names and became Lithuanians. There was no choice, as it was forbidden for them to opt as Germans.

=== Soviet rehoming ===
Soviet authorities sent some children who could be identified as German orphans in the former East Prussia to stay in orphanages administered by Soviet military officers but staffed mostly with some of the remaining Germans. In late 1947, 4,700 German orphans were officially registered in Kaliningrad. Orphans were also adopted by Russian families in the Soviet Union, though documents about these adoptions are not open to the public. In 1948, the children's village of Pinnow, then called Kinderdorf Kyritz, was opened. Orphans who managed to live with Lithuanian farmers remained there mostly undetected.

=== Expulsion to Soviet Occupation Zone of Germany ===
In 1946, the Soviets began emptying Samland (or Sambia Peninsula) of Germans. In October 1947, the Soviets decided to resettle 30,000 Germans from Kaliningrad Oblast in the Soviet Occupation Zone of Germany by train. In 1947, the Soviet Union sent trainloads of orphans to the Occupation Zone; these train rides took four to seven days, partly without food or toilet facilities and some children did not survive. On 15 February 1948, the Ministerial Council of the USSR decided to resettle all Germans in the former East Prussia, declaring them illegal residents in their own homeland. According to Soviet sources, 102,125 people were resettled in 1947 and 1948. Of those, only 99,481 arrived, though sources of the German Democratic Republic (East Germany) attributed this to "perhaps a Soviet calculation error." In May 1951, another 3,000 East Prussian Umsiedler Germans came to East Germany. Some orphans managed to flee from East Germany to West Germany where they had better living conditions. At that time, some of the young orphans had no knowledge of their identity, information in search files was vague, and the occupational development difficult.

== Survivors ==
None of the events of the Wolf children were reported in the press and they only became known to the public from 1990 after the collapse of communism in Eastern Europe. The official position of the Soviet and Polish governments at the time was that there were no Germans in these areas, and this had been their official position as early as the Potsdam Agreement in August 1945. Historian Ruth Leiserowitz, who lived in Lithuania, researched and published books about the Wolfkinder of East Prussia under her maiden name, Ruth Kibelka, and her married name. Some historical records given by children from East Prussia survived, describing how their families were overtaken by advancing Soviet forces as they tried to flee. They were sent back to their old homes in East Prussia, found them destroyed, were expelled from their homes, and then some died from starvation, cold, and typhoid fever. The orphans had to find a way of surviving and became Wolf children. Another five orphans, born in the years 1930–1939, told Leiserowitz how they managed to survive and were transferred to a children's home in East Germany.

In an obituary notice for an East Prussian woman, born in 1939 and deceased in 2009, it was revealed that she had lived as a Wolf child under terrible conditions as an orphan without home and shelter in East Prussia and Lithuania.

The story of one survivor can be read in Abandoned and Forgotten: An Orphan Girl's Tale of Survival in World War II by Evelyne Tannehill. It details how the author and her family fell victim to the Soviets who invaded her parents' farm by the Baltic Sea in East Prussia. Her family was separated; only after the collapse of the Soviet Union in 1991 was she able to return to East Prussia to revisit her childhood homeland.

Another outstanding story is that of Liesabeth Otto, born in 1937, who, after her mother had died from starvation, went with her brothers and sisters to her homeplace Wehlau, where she managed to survive until 1953 by working and begging. In 1953, she was sent to a detention camp for children because she was caught stealing food and clothes. After an odyssey through many detention camps, later on looking for work in the Soviet Union, she located her father and brother in West Germany in the 1970s.

== Wolf children today in Lithuania ==
=== Fate ===
Several hundred Wolf children were discovered in Lithuania after the separation from Russia. In 2010, almost 100 still lived there. From the beginning of the 1990s on, Wolf children have fought for their German citizenship. They have their own association, the Edelweiß-Wolfskinder association. The Federal Office of Administration within the German Federal Ministry of the Interior long held that persons who left Königsberg territory after World War II had renounced their German citizenship.

From January 1, 2008, on, compensation is granted by Lithuanian law for those persons who suffered on account of World War II and the Soviet occupation. Consequently, Wolf children get a small additional pension. In German laws, the Wolf children are not mentioned. From private sponsors they get a small quarterly stipend, organized by Wolfgang Freiherr von Stetten.

Today, some Wolf children aim to learn the fate of their relatives, obtain German citizenship, reunite with their families, leave the country for Germany, and remain faithful to German culture.

=== Association ===
The association Edelweiß-Wolfskinder is headquartered in Vilnius. Another location is in Klaipėda. It gets support from German donors. The members can meet and exchange views and stories. The members are old and weak and rarely can speak the German language. Aid for the German minority in the Baltic states expired in 2008.

== Search for relatives ==
Since the fall of the Iron Curtain, people could once again travel to research or reclaim their identities as Germans.

The German Red Cross helps to identify and locate family members who lost contact with one another, such as the Wolf children, during the turmoil in East Prussia. "It was only the politics of Gorbachev which allowed the opening of the Russian archives. Since the 1990s, the fates of about 200,000 additional missing persons have been clarified. More information about the fates of Germans who were taken prisoners and died still remain in unopened archives in Eastern and South-eastern Europe.

== In memory ==
Valdas Adamkus, then President of Lithuania, stated that an exhibition will be opened in Bad Iburg which will be named "The Lost History of East Prussia: Wolf Children and Their Fate".

Five kilometers north of Tilsit on the crossroad of A 216 Tauroggen-Tilsit with A 226 from Heydekrug there is a memorial for Wolf children ("Wolfskinder-Denkmal"). The goal of the memorial is to publicize the fate of all human beings who were killed or died from starvation in East Prussia in the years 1944–1947, and to remember the orphan children left behind. Another memorial, the House of Wolf children, will be created with a permanent exhibition to remember Wolf children in Mikytai/Mikieten at the crossroad Sovetsk/Tilsit. This memorial will be organized by historians of the Verein Wolfkinder.Geschichtsverein e. V. in Berlin.

The aid by Lithuanian people for the hungry East Prussians was invaluable. Every historical record brings new facts and insights. Mentioning this time and these circumstances will always cause thankful thoughts for the Lithuanian people of that time.

Former German President Christian Wulff was visited on May 10, 2011, by a group of Wolf children from Lithuania. The leader of the parliamentary group within CDU/CSU for expelled, relocated and German minorities, Klaus Brähmig, believes that research on Wolf children should be intensified:

The president gives an important sign of solidarity by meeting Wolf children, whose fate is not well known in Germany. It is encouraging that politics and the media report more and more on these orphans, of whom many up to now are not aware of their German descent. The union goes on requiring, that scientific research ought to be intensified and matters of Wolf children dealt within the Bundesvertriebenenstiftung.

In June 2024, the Seimas of Lithuania officially designated 14 September as Wolf Children Remembrance Day. The date was chosen to commemorate the first reunion of former East Prussian children, which took place in Klaipėda on 14 September 1991.

== Films and literature ==
- Wolfskinder, documentary film, 120 min., Eberhard Fechner (director), Germany 1991
- Irgendwo gebettelt, irgendwo geklaut… Ein Wolfskind auf Spurensuche Report, 30 min., Ingeborg Jacobs (director), Hartmut Seifert (camera), Germany 1994
- Die eiserne Maria, documentary film, 60 min., Ingeborg Jacobs (director), Hartmut Seifert (camera), Germany 2002.
- Die Kinder der Flucht, Part 2 Wolfskinder, Hans-Christoph Blumenberg (director), Germany 2006
- Vilko vaikai, a novel by Eugenijus Remigijus Baltrušaitis
- Wolf Children, a 2013 German film filmed in Lithuania
- Ruth Leiserowitz
  - Wolfskinder: Grenzgänger an der Memel (Wolf children: Commuters at Memel); 1996; ISBN 3-86163-064-8
  - Vilko Vaikai – kelias per Nemuną (Wolf children: across the Neman); 2000; ISBN 9955-00-014-7
  - Von Ostpreußen nach Kyritz: Wolfskinder auf dem Weg nach Brandenburg (From East Prussia to Kyritz: Wolf children on the way to Brandenburg); 2003; ISBN 3-932502-33-7

== See also ==
- Evacuation of German civilians during the end of World War II
- Japanese orphans in China
- Kidnapping of children by Nazi Germany
- Feral child
- Robinson Crusoes of Warsaw

== Literature ==
- Christel Brandenburg: Ruined by the Reich: Memoire of an East Prussian Family, 1916-1945. McFarland and Co Inc. 2003. ISBN 0-7864-1615-7
- Evelyne Tannehill: ABANDONED AND FORGOTTEN: An Orphan Girl's Tale of Survival in World War II. Wheatmark 2007. ISBN 978-1-58736-693-2
- ---Documentation for a student project, no blog---. Stian Eisenträger: The Wolfskinder Project. The forgotten War Orphans - Hitler's Last Victims?
- Matthias Pankau: ‘I Thought There Was No German Anymore‘’. In: The Atlantic Times. A Monthly Newspaper from Germany, May 2009
- (in German) Ruth Kibelka: Wolfskinder. Grenzgänger an der Memel. (title translated to English: Wolf children - Passing the border at river Memel.) 4. Auflage. Basisdruck, Berlin 2003, ISBN 3-86163-064-8
- (in German) Ruth Leiserowitz: Von Ostpreußen nach Kyritz – Wolfskinder auf dem Weg nach Brandenburg. (title translated to English: From East Prussia to the city of Kyritz - Wolf children on their way to Brandenburg.) Potsdam 2003, ISBN 3-932502-33-7. Im Internet abrufbar unter Wolfskinder aus Ostpreußen.
- (in German) Ingeborg Jacobs: Wolfskind. Die unglaubliche Lebensgeschichte des ostpreußischen Wolfskindes Liesabeth Otto. Propyläen, Berlin 2010, ISBN 3-549-07371-2
- (in German) Keine Hilfe für deutsche "Wolfskinder". (title translated to English: No help for German "wolf children") In: Der Spiegel. Hamburg 2007, Nr. 7, p 21, ISSN 0038-7452
- "Neue Zürcher Zeitung vom 13. November 2008: Litauens «Wolfskinder» – Fremdlinge im eigenen Selbst. (title translated to English: Lithuanian "Wolf children" - strangers in their own self)" (in German).
- Volksbund Deutsche Kriegsgräberfürsorge e. V., ed. (2008), Treibgut des Krieges - Zeugnisse von Flucht und Vertreibung der Deutschen (Zeitzeugenberichte über Flucht, Vertreibung, Wolfskinder) [flotsam and jetsam of war - Witnesses of flight, kicking out, wolf children] (in German), Kassel: Volksbund Deutsche Kriegsgräberfürsorge e. V., Kassel
- (in German) Hans-Joachim Kroschewsky: "Königsberg/Ostpreußen - Wir wollen nur leben - Familiendrama von Flucht und Vertreibung 1944 bis 1948." (title translated: We want to live - Dramatic family story of flight and expulsion 1944 to 1948). Wagner-Verlag. (Father had to stay and was member of Wehrmacht, grand parents resettled in 1947, mother relocated in USSR, alone until March 1948, resettled to the west).
- (in German) „Keine Sprache, keine Heimat“. (title translated to English language: No mother tongue - no home). In: Der Spiegel 3/1996, S. 62-68
- (in German) Ursula Dorn: Ich war ein Wolfskind aus Königsberg. (title translated to English language: I was a Wolf child from Koenigsberg). Biographischer Roman. Edition riedenburg. Salzburg 2008. ISBN 978-3-902647-09-2
