= 1964 Alabama Democratic presidential primary =

- May 5, 1964; June 2, 1964 (runoff)

38 Democratic National Convention delegates (36 pledged, 2 unpledged)
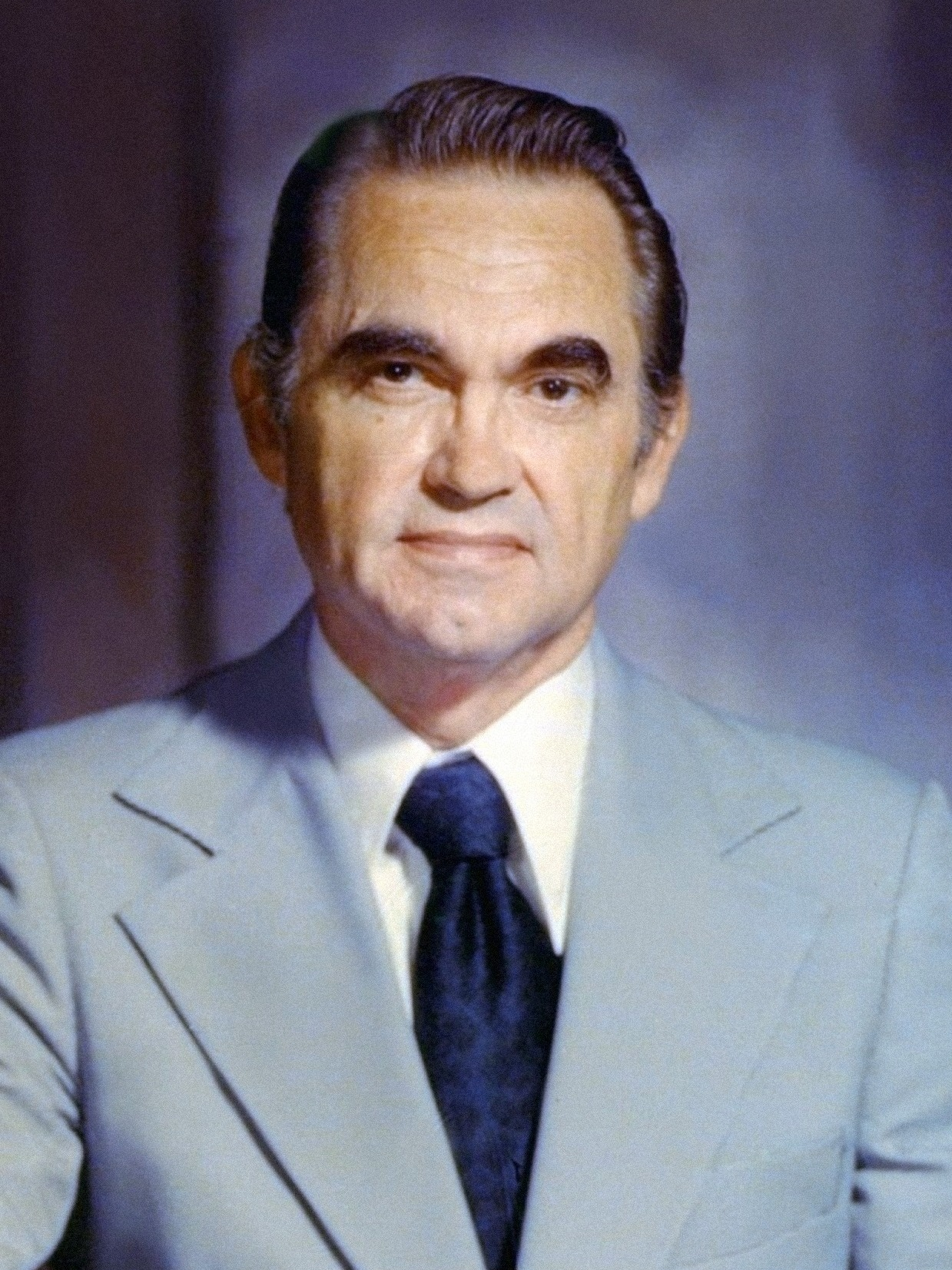
Candidate	George Wallace
Home state	Alabama
Delegate count	36
First round	846,458; 100.00% 33 delegates
Runoff	153,425; 100.00% 3 delegates
- All delegate candidates were required to be pledged to Wallace.

A presidential primary was held in the U.S. state of Alabama on May 5, 1964, with runoff elections on June 2, to elect delegates representing Alabama to the 1964 Democratic National Convention. Thirty-six delegates were to be elected, four from each of the state's nine old congressional districts, with no at-large delegates to be elected. Nineteen delegate candidates went unopposed. In January 1964, the State Democratic Executive Committee voted to nominate the incumbent Governor of Alabama, George Wallace, as a favorite son candidate, mandating that all prospective delegate candidates be pledged to Wallace for the Democratic nomination until they were released by him. As a result, all thirty-six pledged delegates went to Wallace.

Incumbent president Lyndon B. Johnson was renominated by way of voice vote; individual votes cast by state delegation were not recorded. At the Convention, only four of the thirty-six delegates reportedly voted to accept an oath requiring loyalty to the national Democratic Party nominees. Nine delegates from Alabama were seated after signing loyalty oaths and nominated former Governor of Georgia and Wallace foe Carl Sanders for vice-president. Upon Sanders' request, the delegates withdrew the bid and backed Hubert Humphrey.

== See also ==
- 1964 Democratic Party presidential primaries
- 1964 United States presidential election
- 1964 United States presidential election in Alabama
- 1964 United States elections
