= Representative Brown =

Representative Brown may refer to numerous representatives.

== United States representatives ==
=== A ===
- Aaron V. Brown (1795–1859), U.S. Representative from Tennessee
- Albert G. Brown (1813–1880), U.S. Representative from Mississippi
- Anson Brown (1800–1840), U.S. Representative from New York
- Anthony Brown (Maryland politician) (born 1961), U.S. Representative from Maryland

=== B ===
- Bud Brown (politician) (1927–2022), U.S. Representative from Ohio

=== C ===
- Charles Brown (congressman) (1797–1883), U.S. Representative from Pennsylvania
- Charles Elwood Brown (1834–1904), U.S. Representative from Ohio
- Charles Harrison Brown (1920–2003), U.S. Representative from Missouri
- Clarence J. Brown (1893–1965), U.S. Representative from Ohio
- Corrine Brown (born 1946), U.S. Representative from Florida
- Charles Browne (politician) (1875–1947), U.S. Representative from New Jersey

=== E ===
- Edward E. Browne (1868–1945), U.S. Representative from Wisconsin
- Elias Brown (1793–1857), U.S. Representative from Maryland

=== F ===
- Foster V. Brown (1852–1937), U.S. Representative from Tennessee

=== G ===
- Garry E. Brown (1923–1998), U.S. Representative from Michigan
- George Brown Jr. (1920–1999), U.S. Representative from California
- George H. Browne (1818–1885), U.S. Representative from Rhode Island
- Ginny Brown-Waite (born 1943), U.S. Representative from Florida

=== H ===
- Hank Brown (born 1940), U.S. Representative from Colorado
- Henry E. Brown Jr. (born 1935), U.S. Representative from South Carolina

=== J ===
- James S. Brown (1824–1878), U.S. Representative from Wisconsin
- James W. Brown (1844–1909), U.S. Representative from Pennsylvania
- Jason B. Brown (1839–1898), U.S. Representative from Indiana
- Jeremiah Brown (politician) (1785–1858), U.S. Representative from Pennsylvania
- John Brown (Maryland politician) (died 1815), U.S. Representative from Maryland
- John Brown (Pennsylvania politician) (1772–1845), U.S. Representative from Pennsylvania
- John Brown (Rhode Island politician) (1736–1803), U.S. Representative from Rhode Island
- John Brewer Brown (1836–1898), U.S. Representative from Maryland
- John Robert Brown (Virginia politician) (1842–1927), U.S. Representative from Virginia
- John W. Brown (New York politician) (1796–1875), U.S. Representative from New York
- John Y. Brown (politician, born 1835) (1835–1904), U.S. Representative from Kentucky
- John Y. Brown Sr. (1900–1985), U.S. Representative from Kentucky
- Joseph Edgar Brown (1880–1939), U.S. Representative from Tennessee

=== L ===
- Lathrop Brown (1883–1959), U.S. Representative from New York

=== M ===
- Milton Brown (politician) (1804–1883), U.S. Representative from Tennessee

=== P ===
- Paul Brown (Georgia politician) (1880–1961), U.S. Representative from Georgia
- Prentiss M. Brown (1889–1973), U.S. Representative from Michigan

=== R ===
- Robert Brown (Pennsylvania politician) (1744–1823), U.S. Representative from Pennsylvania

=== S ===
- Seth W. Brown (1841–1923), U.S. Representative from Ohio
- Sherrod Brown (born 1952), U.S. Representative from Ohio

=== T ===
- Thomas H. B. Browne (1844–1892), U.S. Representative from Virginia
- Thomas M. Browne (1829–1891), U.S. Representative from Indiana

=== W ===
- Webster E. Brown (1851–1929), U.S. Representative from Wisconsin
- William Brown (congressman) (1779–1833), U.S. Representative from Kentucky
- William G. Brown Sr. (1800–1884), U.S. Representative from Virginia
- William Gay Brown Jr. (1856–1916), U.S. Representative from West Virginia
- William J. Brown (Indiana politician) (1805–1857), U.S. Representative from Indiana
- William Ripley Brown (1840–1916), U.S. Representative from Kansas
- William Wallace Brown (1836–1926), U.S. Representative from Pennsylvania

== U.S. state representatives ==
=== Alabama ===
- Chip Brown
- K. L. Brown (born 1951)
- Red Brown (politician) (1787–1852)

=== Alaska ===
- Fred Brown (Alaska politician) (1943–2014)

=== Arizona ===
- Jack A. Brown (1929–2015)
- Keith Brown (pole vaulter) (1913–1991)

=== Arkansas ===
- Earnest Brown (judge) (born 1970)
- F. E. Brown (1858–1928)
- Karilyn Brown
- Matthew Brown (Arkansas politician)

=== Colorado ===
- George L. Brown (1926–2006)
- J. Paul Brown (born 1953)
- Kyle Brown (Colorado politician)

=== Connecticut ===
- James Brown (Connecticut politician) (1682–1769)

=== Florida ===
- Corrine Brown (born 1946)
- Gene Brown (politician) (1933–1996)
- J. Hyatt Brown (born 1937)
- Kamia Brown (born 1980)
- Richard Lewis Brown (1854–1948)
- Shirley Brown (Florida politician) (born 1952)
- Thomas Brown (Florida politician) (1785–1867)
- Tom Brown (Florida politician) (1933–2024)

=== Georgia ===
- Paul Brown (Georgia politician) (1880–1961)

=== Idaho ===
- L. Edward Brown (born 1937)

=== Illinois ===
- Michael J. Brown (born 1941)
- William Brown (Illinois politician) (1819–1891)

=== Indiana ===
- Charlie Brown (Indiana politician) (born 1938)
- Ethan Allen Brown (1776–1852)
- Jason B. Brown (1839–1898)
- Tim Brown (Indiana politician) (born 1956)
- William J. Brown (Indiana politician) (1805–1857)

=== Iowa ===
- Timi Brown-Powers (born 1967)

=== Kansas ===
- Anthony Brown (Kansas politician) (born 1968)
- Tony Brown (Kansas politician) (born 1961)

=== Kentucky ===
- John Y. Brown Sr. (1900–1985)
- Larry D. Brown

=== Louisiana ===
- Chad Brown (politician) (born 1970)
- J. Marshall Brown (1926–1995)
- Terry Brown (Louisiana politician)

=== Maine ===
- Marion Fuller Brown (1917–2011)
- Dwight A. Brown (1918–1990)
- Stewart B. Brown (died 1973)

=== Massachusetts ===
- Benjamin Brown (politician) (1756–1831)
- Russell P. Brown (1891–1965)
- Scott Brown (politician) (born 1959)

=== Michigan ===
- Ammon Brown (1798–1882)
- Cameron S. Brown (born 1954)
- Jim N. Brown (1926–1991)
- John S. Brown (Michigan politician) (c. 1810–?)
- Lisa Brown (Michigan politician) (born 1967)
- Mary Brown (Michigan politician) (1935–2021)
- Rich Brown (Michigan politician) (born 1956)
- Terry Brown (Michigan politician) (born 1959)
- Thomas H. Brown (Michigan politician) (1917–2002)
- Vernon J. Brown (1874–1964)

=== Minnesota ===
- Chuck Brown (politician) (1951–2003)
- Robin Brown (politician) (born 1961)

=== Mississippi ===
- Bo Brown (politician) (1949–2026)
- Cecil Brown (Mississippi politician) (born 1947)
- Chris Brown (Mississippi politician) (born 1971)

=== Missouri ===
- Benjamin Gratz Brown (1826–1885)
- Chris Brown (Missouri politician)
- Cloria Brown (1942–2018)
- Jason R. Brown (born 1970)
- Napoleon Bonaparte Brown (1834–1910)
- Wanda Brown (politician) (born 1966)
- Wilson Brown (politician) (1804–1855)

=== Montana ===
- Dave Brown (Montana politician) (1948–1998)
- Dee Brown (politician) (born 1948)
- Roy Brown (Montana politician) (born 1951)

=== Nevada ===
- Tracy Brown-May (born 1967)

=== New Hampshire ===
- Carroll Brown Jr.
- Pennington Brown
- Richard Brown (New Hampshire politician)
- Titus Brown (1786–1849)

=== New Mexico ===
- Cathrynn Brown

=== New York ===
- Ari Brown (politician) (born 1975)
- Keith Brown (New York politician) (born 1968)

=== North Carolina ===
- Bedford Brown (1795–1870)
- Brian Brown (North Carolina politician) (born 1979)
- John Brown (North Carolina politician) (1738–1812)
- Larry R. Brown (1943–2012)
- Gloristine Brown
- Kanika Brown
- Terry M. Brown Jr. (born 1987)

=== Ohio ===
- Edna Brown (1940–2022)
- Jeremiah A. Brown (1841–1913)
- John William Brown (1913–1993)
- Les Brown (speaker) (born 1945)
- Richard Brown (Ohio politician)
- Robert Brown (Ohio politician) (1928–1985)
- Seth W. Brown (1841–1923)
- Sherrod Brown (born 1952)
- Tim Brown (Ohio politician) (born 1962)

=== Oregon ===
- Kate Brown (born 1960)

=== Pennsylvania ===
- Amen Brown (born 1987)
- Charles Brown (congressman) (1797–1883)
- Harold L. Brown (born 1946)
- Homer S. Brown (1896–1977)
- Jeremiah Brown (politician) (1785–1858)
- Marla Brown (born 1970)
- Rosemary Brown (American politician) (born 1970)
- Vanessa L. Brown (born 1965)
- William Wallace Brown (1836–1926)
- Pat Browne (born 1963)

=== South Carolina ===
- Boyd Brown (born 1986)
- Edgar Allan Brown (1888–1975)
- Henry E. Brown Jr. (born 1935)
- Joe Ellis Brown (1933–2018)
- Robert Brown (South Carolina politician) (born 1950)
- Walter B. Brown (1920–1998)

=== South Dakota ===
- Arnold M. Brown (1931–2024)

=== Tennessee ===
- Aaron V. Brown (1795–1859)
- Dorothy Lavinia Brown (1919–2004)
- Tommie Brown (1934–2026)

=== Texas ===
- Betty Brown (born 1939)
- John Henry Brown (1820–1895)
- Raleigh Brown (1921–2009)
- Red Brown (politician) (1787–1852)

=== Utah ===
- Derek Brown (politician) (born 1971)
- Melvin R. Brown (born 1938)

=== Vermont ===
- Charles Henry Brown (Vermont politician) (1904–1959)
- Nelson Brownell
- Jana Brown

=== Washington ===
- Lisa Brown (Washington politician) (born 1956)

=== Wyoming ===
- Kermit Brown (born 1942)
- Landon Brown (born 1987)

== Hawaiian Kingdom Representatives ==
- Cecil Brown (Hawaii politician) (1850–1917)

== See also ==
- List of people with surname Brown
- Senator Brown (disambiguation)
