= 1964 New Jersey Democratic presidential primary =

1964 New Jersey Democratic presidential primaries
- April 21, 1964
- Presidential delegate primary

80 Democratic National Convention delegates
Candidate	Uncommitted
Delegate count	80
- Presidential preference primary (non-binding)

No Democratic National Convention delegates
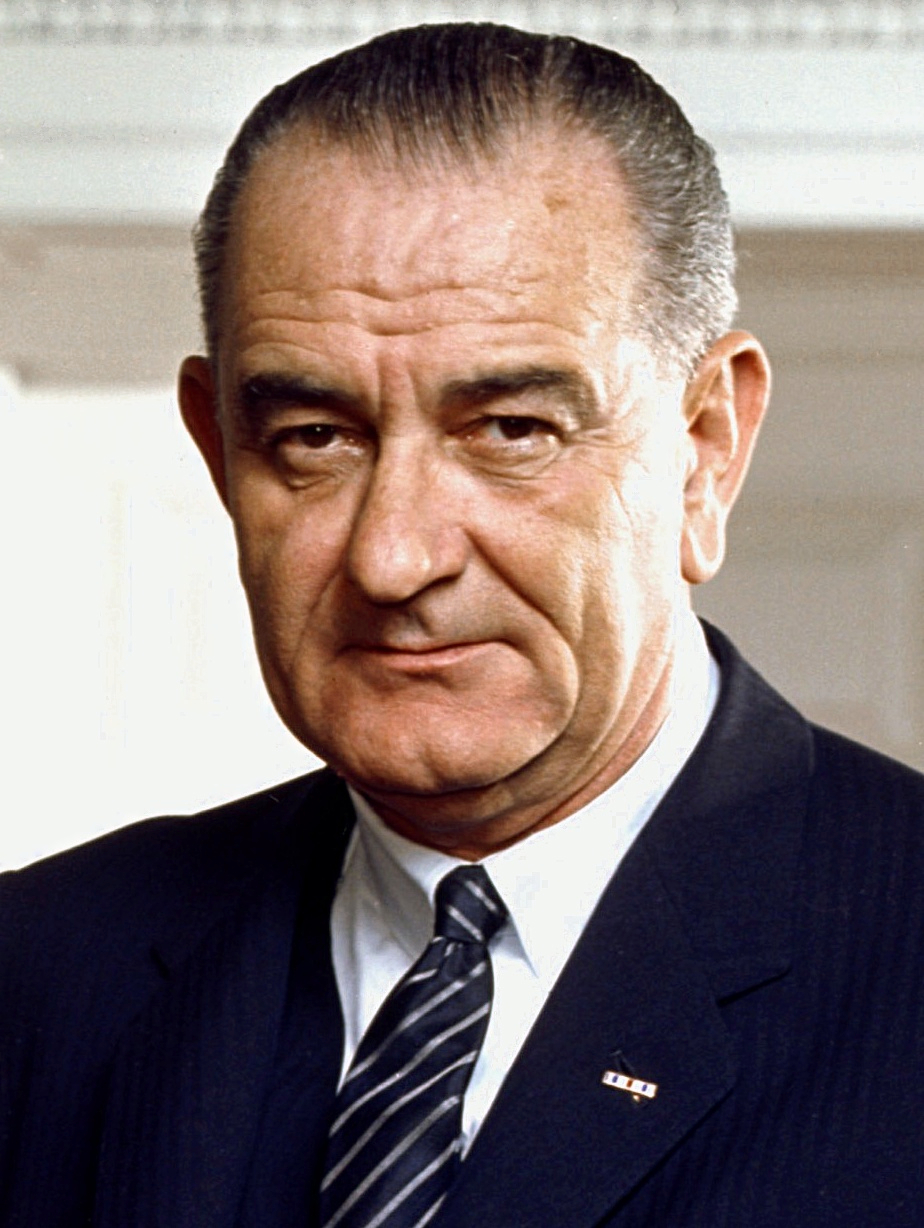

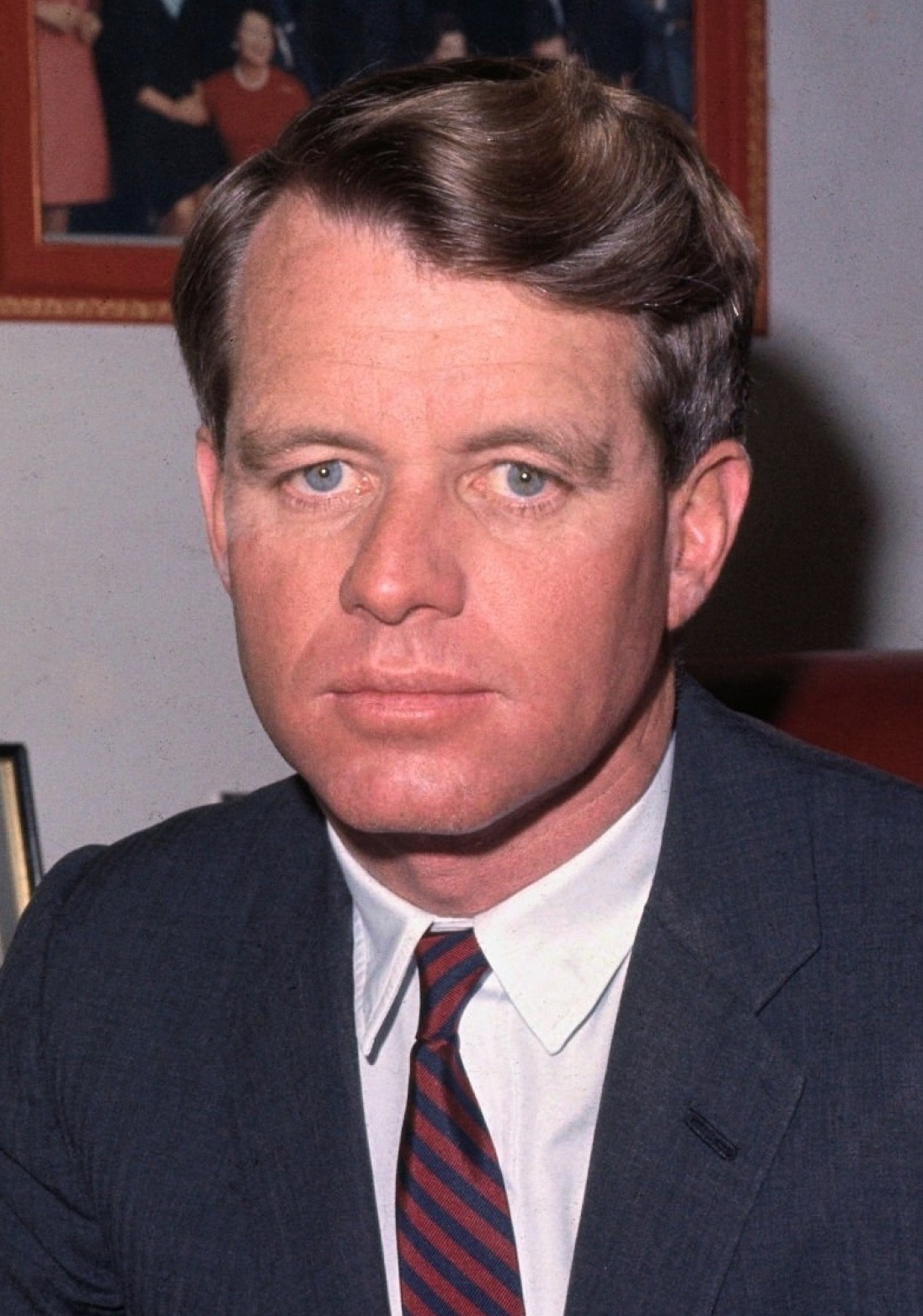
Candidate	Lyndon B. Johnson (write-in)	George Wallace (write-in)	Robert F. Kennedy (write-in)
Home state	Texas	Alabama	New York
Popular vote	4,863	491	431
Percentage	82.3%	8.3%	7.3%
- County results Johnson Wallace Johnson/Kennedy tie None

The 1964 New Jersey Democratic presidential primary was held on April 21, 1964, in New Jersey as one of the Democratic Party's statewide nomination contests ahead of the 1964 United States presidential election.

In the binding delegate primary, competing slates of uncommitted delegates contested the election on a ballot The New York Times called "one of the most confusing in the state's recent history." In most districts, however, the "Regular Democratic Organization" slate assembled by state and local party leaders ultimately ran unopposed.

In the preference primary held at the same time, no candidate filed to run, but President Johnson easily received a large majority of write-in votes, though fewer than six thousand were cast. In some counties, a write-in vote was difficult or impossible to cast due to the nature of the voting machines used, and no vote was recorded in Cape May or Essex counties.

== Background ==
=== Procedure ===
Thirty-five delegates were elected at-large on a statewide ticket, and another three were elected from each of the state's 15 congressional districts.

On March 9, the legislature passed an act authorizing voters to vote for delegates as a bloc, if they chose to be grouped together, if a county clerk found that the capacity of voting machines made it impossible to vote for individual delegates. Nine counties (Atlantic, Bergen, Burlington, Camden, Hudson, Middlesex, Monmouth, Ocean, and Somerset) opted for this system, but on April 2, Superior Court judge Nelson K. Mintz ruled that adapters for voting machines used in the state were available and that the county clerks could not "substitute their standard for the standard of 'impossibility' prescribed by the Legislature".

== Results ==
=== Preference primary results ===
1964 New Jersey presidential preference primary
Party	Candidate	Votes	%
Democratic	Lyndon B. Johnson (inc.; write-in)	4,863	82.30%
Democratic	George Wallace (write-in)	491	8.31%
Democratic	Robert F. Kennedy (write-in)	431	7.29%
Republican	Henry Cabot Lodge (write-in)	69	1.17%
Republican	Barry Goldwater (write-in)	30	0.51%
Republican	Richard Nixon (write-in)	19	0.32%
Republican	Nelson Rockefeller (write-in)	3	0.05%
Republican	William Scranton (write-in)	3	0.05%
Total votes		5,909	100.00%

=== Delegate primary results ===
1964 New Jersey Democratic primary
Delegate slate	Candidate	Delegate candidates		Delegates		Aggregate votes	
Delegate slate	Candidate	State	District	Total	Of total (%)	Total	Of total (%)
Regular Democratic Organization	Uncommitted	35	45	80	100.00	4,920,735	93.50%
Regular Democrats Real Democracy	Uncommitted	14	0	0	0.00	337,648	6.41%
No Slogan	Uncommitted	0	2	0	0.00	2,963	0.06%
Regular Conference Democrat	Uncommitted	0	2	0	0.00	1,157	0.02%
Tax Cut Equal Opportunity Now	Uncommitted	0	1	0	0.00	477	0.01%
Total		49	50	80	100.0	5,262,980	100.00
Registered voters, and turnout							

==== Delegate primary results by contest ====
1964 New Jersey Democratic primary
Contest	Delegates and popular vote		Total
Contest	Regular Democratic Organization	Other	Total
Delegates at-large	35; 4,428,453 (92.92%)	337,648 (7.08%) (Note: All votes cast for the "Regular Democrats Real Democracy" slate led by James J. Mack.)	4,766,101
1st district	3; 45,862 (100.00%)	—N/a	45,862
2nd district	3; 13,907 (89.49%)	1,634 (10.51%) (Note: 477 votes (3.07%) cast for Herod E. McLeod, running with the slogan "Tax Cut Equal Opportunity Now" and 1,157 votes (7.44%) cast for the "Regular Conference Democrat" ticket.)	15,541
3rd district	3; 27,622 (100.00%)	—N/a	27,622
4th district	3; 26,884 (90.07%)	2,963 (9.93%) (Note: All votes cast for Joseph E. Lavenberg and Chester McCullough of Delanco, running with no slogan.)	29,847
5th district	3; 12,459 (100.00%)	—N/a	12,459
6th district	3; 55,715 (100.00%)	—N/a	55,715
7th district	3; 29,098 (100.00%)	—N/a	29,098
8th district	3; 14,544 (100.00%)	—N/a	14,544
9th district	3; 30,836 (100.00%)	—N/a	30,836
10th district	3; 32,238 (100.00%)	—N/a	32,238
11th district	3; 21,176 (100.00%)	—N/a	21,176
12th district	3; 23,033 (100.00%)	—N/a	23,033
13th district	3; 54,633 (100.00%)	—N/a	54,633
14th district	3; 56,055 (100.00%)	—N/a	56,055
15th district	3; 48,220 (100.00%)	—N/a	48,220
District subtotal	45 492,282 (99.07%)	4,597 (0.93%)	496,879

== Aftermath ==
At the 1964 Democratic National Convention in Atlantic City, the New Jersey delegates joined a voice vote nominating Lyndon B. Johnson for election to a full term.
