= Senator Stubbs =

Senator Stubbs may refer to:

- Daniel P. Stubbs (1829–1905), Iowa State Senate
- Everett Stubbs (fl. 2020s), South Carolina State Senate

== See also ==
- Senator Stubblefield (disambiguation)
