= Gene Brown =

Gene Brown may refer to:

- Gene Brown (basketball) (1935–2020), American basketball player
- Gene Brown (professor) (1926–2017), American professor of biochemistry
- Gene Brown (politician) (1933–1996), member of the Florida House of Representatives

== See also ==
- Eugene Brown (disambiguation)
