= Senator Fanning =

Senator Fanning may refer to:

- John Pat Fanning (born 1934), West Virginia State Senate
- Ken Fanning (born 1947), Alaska State Senate
- Mike Fanning (politician) (born 1967), North Carolina State Senate
