= 1964 New Hampshire Democratic presidential primary =

- March 10, 1964
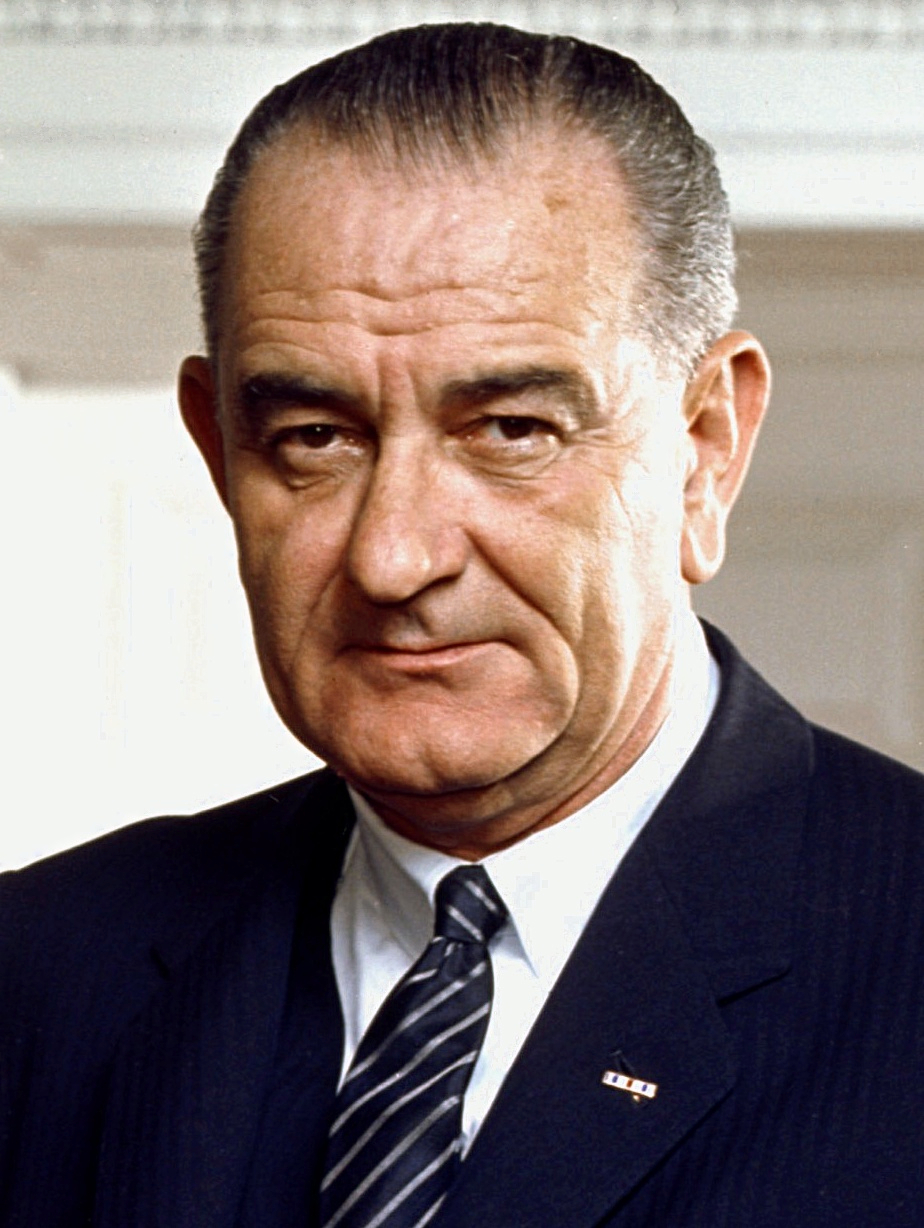

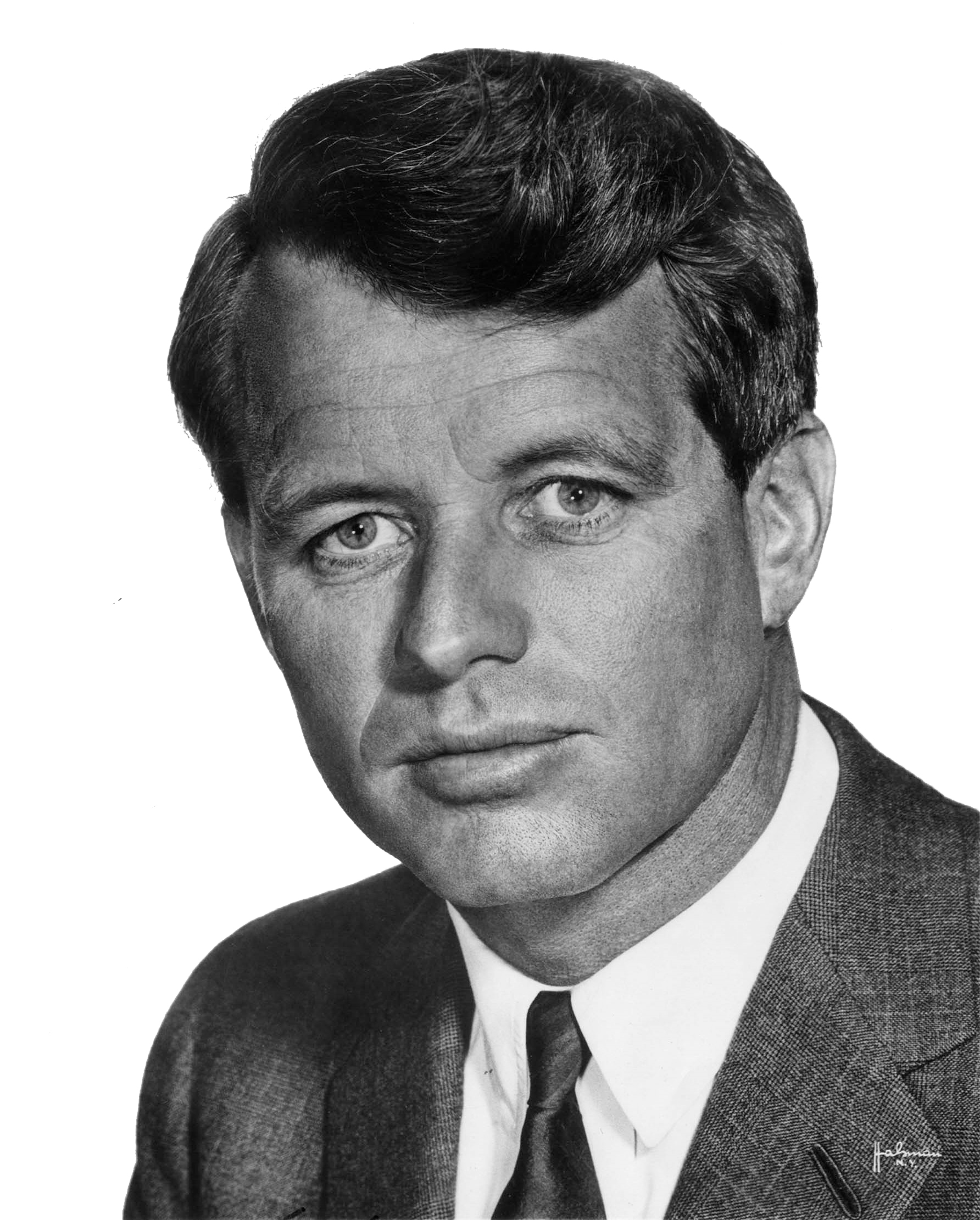
Candidate	Lyndon B. Johnson	Robert F. Kennedy (write-in)
Home state	Texas	Massachusetts
Popular vote	29,317	487
Percentage	95.3%	1.6%
- County results Johnson

The 1964 New Hampshire Democratic presidential primary was held on March 10, 1964, in New Hampshire as one of the Democratic Party's statewide nomination contests ahead of the 1964 United States presidential election.

Incumbent President Lyndon B. Johnson, who faced no opposition other than write-ins, easily won the primary. He earned the largest percentage of the popular vote for any Democrat in the history of the New Hampshire primary. Robert F. Kennedy, former United States Attorney General and brother of late President John F. Kennedy, came in second place with 1.6% despite decling to run. Johnson would go on to win re-election against Republican Barry Goldwater by an overwhelming landslide.

George Lincoln Rockwell, founder of the American Nazi Party was removed from the primary in February 1964.

== Results ==
New Hampshire Democratic primary, March 10, 1964
Candidate	Votes	Percentage
Lyndon B. Johnson	29,317	95.3%
Robert F. Kennedy	487	1.6%
Henry Cabot Lodge Jr. (Republican)	280	0.9%
Richard Nixon (Republican)	232	0.8%
Barry Goldwater (Republican)	193	0.6%
Nelson Rockefeller (Republican)	109	0.4%
Adlai Stevenson II	16	0.1%
Hubert Humphrey	11	<0.1%
Other write-ins	132	0.4%
Total	30,777	100%
