= Mike Fanning (politician) =

American politician (born 1967)

Member of the South Carolina Senate from the 17th district
- In office November 14, 2016 – December 2024
- Preceded by: Creighton B. Coleman
- Succeeded by: Everett Stubbs

Personal details
- Born: April 4, 1967 (age 59) Columbia, South Carolina, U.S.
- Party: Democratic
- Spouse: Stephanie Locus (m. 2007)
- Children: 1
- Education: Wofford College (B.A.); University of South Carolina (M.S., Ed.S., Ph.D.)
- Profession: Teacher, politician

Michael William Fanning (born April 4, 1967) is an American politician. He was a member of the South Carolina Senate from the 17th District (Chester, Fairfield & York Counties), serving from 2016 to 2024. He is a member of the Democratic party.

== Political career ==
=== S.C. Senate ===
==== Elections ====
- 2016 South Carolina Senate election: In 2016, Fanning succeeded in defeating Democratic 16-year incumbent Creighton Coleman after forcing him into a runoff in an initial three-way primary. Fanning would go onto defeat the Republican challenger, Mark Palmer.
- 2020 South Carolina Senate election: In 2020, Fanning defeated Democratic primary challenger MaryGail Douglas, a former member of the South Carolina House of Representatives. Fanning would go onto defeat Republican Erin Mosley in the general election, although Fanning would only win by about 1,600 votes .
- 2024 South Carolina Senate election: In March 2024, several Republicans filed challenges to the Senate seat held by Fanning, including attorney Everett Stubbs, businessmen Tripp McCoy and Tibi Czentye. Stubbs won the Republican primary, and defeated Fanning in a close general election race.

== Personal life ==
Fanning was born in Columbia, South Carolina on April 4, 1967 to Joseph and Janet Fanning. He received a B.A. from Wofford College in 1991, an M.S (1996), Ed.S. (1997), and a Ph.D. (2008) from the University of South Carolina. He also received a teaching certificate from Benedict College in 1992. He taught at Estill High School from 1992 to 1994, and at Columbia High School from 1994 to 1998.

Fanning is the Executive Director of the Olde English Consortium , an education-focused non-profit.

South Carolina Senate
Preceded by Creighton B. Coleman	Member of the South Carolina Senate from the 17th district 2016–2024	Incumbent
