= Eugene Brown =

Eugene Brown may refer to:

- Sufi Abdul Hamid (Eugene Brown, 1903–1938), African-American religious and labor leader
- Gene Brown (basketball) (1935–2020), American basketball player, and sheriff of San Francisco, 1978–1979

== See also ==
- Gene Brown (disambiguation)
