= Boyd Brown =

American politician

H. Boyd Brown

Member of the South Carolina House of Representatives from the 41st district
- In office 2008–2012
- Preceded by: Creighton B. Coleman
- Succeeded by: MaryGail Douglas

Personal details
- Born: October 27, 1986 (age 39) Columbia, South Carolina, United States
- Education: University of South Carolina

H. Boyd Brown (born October 27, 1986) is a former member of the South Carolina House of Representatives for District 41 from Fairfield County, South Carolina.

== Biography ==
Brown graduated from the University of South Carolina in 2007, with a degree in political science.

Brown comes from a family of politicians. He was a third generation member of the South Carolina House of Representatives, and is the grandson of Walter B. Brown, a former legislator, lobbyist and railroad executive. His father, David, was one of the longest serving county commissioners in South Carolina and served multiple terms as chairman of Fairfield County Council. His uncle, Judge Walter Boyd "B" Brown, Jr. was a state Family Court Judge until his death, and his great-grandfather, Boyd Brown, was also a member of the South Carolina House of Representatives from Fairfield County, and was chairman of the House Labor and Commerce Committee.

== 2008 election ==
Incumbent Democrat Rep. Creighton B. Coleman announced his run for the South Carolina Senate, vacating his House seat. In 2008, Brown defeated the incumbent Fairfield County School Board member Annie McDaniel with 54% in the Democratic Primary for the seat, and cruised to election in November, defeating his Republican challenger Sean Schaeffner with 81% of the vote. At the time of his election, he was the youngest elected state lawmaker in the United States. On taking office, Brown was appointed to the House Agriculture, Natural Resources and Environmental Affairs Committee.

== 2010 re-election ==
Brown's seat was up for re-election in 2010. In the heavily Democratic seat, he defeated June primary rival Kamau Marcharia before running unopposed in November. In his second term, Brown was appointed to the powerful House Judiciary Committee.

== Retirement from S.C. House of Representatives ==
Brown announced that he would not seek a third term in the South Carolina General Assembly. Wanting to start a successful career in the private sector, he issued a press release announcing his departure from the South Carolina House of Representatives. In a farewell address in June 2012, he talked about the issues important to his generation and the speech attracted national attention.

== Post-legislative career ==
Brown resides in Columbia, South Carolina and owns a government affairs firm, Tompkins, Thompson & Brown. In 2015, he was appointed by the President Pro Tempore of the State Senate to serve on the nine member board of the South Carolina Conservation Bank. Brown also served on the board of his local hospital, Fairfield Memorial, in Winnsboro, South Carolina. Brown is married and resides in Columbia, South Carolina.
