= Walter B. Brown =

American politician and businessman

Walter Brown (May 16, 1920 – March 9, 1998) was a South Carolina politician and businessman.

== Biography ==
A Democrat, he was born in Smallwood, Fairfield County, South Carolina, May 16, 1920 as the son of Boyd and Mary (Tidwell) Brown. He was a member of the South Carolina House of Representatives; a delegate to the Democratic National Convention from South Carolina, 1960, 1964, 1968; the first director of South Carolina Department of General Services (now Budget and Control Board); the vice-president for government affairs of Norfolk Southern Corporation (formerly Southern Railway); the first Trustee Emeritus at the Medical University of South Carolina. Presbyterian.

He died in Fairfield County, South Carolina, on March 9, 1998. The Walter Boyd Brown Industrial Park in Fairfield County was named for him.

He was the grandfather of Representative H. Boyd Brown, a former member of the South Carolina House of Representatives.
