= MaryGail Douglas =

American politician

Member of the South Carolina House of Representatives from the 41st district
- In office November 12, 2013 – 2017
- Preceded by: Boyd Brown
- Succeeded by: Annie McDaniel

Personal details
- Born: January 19, 1950 (age 76) Fairfield County, South Carolina, United States
- Party: Democratic
- Education: University of South Carolina

MaryGail K. Douglas is an American politician. She is a former member of the South Carolina House of Representatives from the 41st District, serving from 2013 to 2017.
