= Everett Stubbs =

American politician

Member of the South Carolina Senate from the 17th district
- Incumbent
- Assumed office January 2025
- Preceded by: Mike Fanning

Personal details
- Party: Republican
- Profession: Attorney

Everett Stubbs is an American politician. He is member of the South Carolina Senate from the 17th District (Chester, Fairfield & York Counties). Stubbs is a member of the Republican party.

== Career ==
Stubbs is an attorney, and has served on Chester County Chamber of Commerce.

== Political career ==
=== S.C. Senate ===
In March 2024, several Republicans filed challenges to the Senate seat held by Democratic incumbent Mike Fanning, including Stubbs and businessmen Tripp McCoy and Tibi Czentye. Stubbs won the Republican primary to face Fanning.

Stubbs pledged to support term limits and was endorsed by Americans for Prosperity - South Carolina.

Fanning conceded to Stubbs after a close race which triggered an automatic recount.

South Carolina Senate
Preceded by Mike Fanning	Member of the South Carolina Senate from the 17th district 2025–	Incumbent
