= Annie McDaniel =

American politician

Member of the South Carolina House of Representatives from the 41st district
- Incumbent
- Assumed office November 12, 2018
- Preceded by: MaryGail Douglas

Personal details
- Born: May 28, 1968 (age 58) Winnsboro, South Carolina, United States
- Party: Democratic
- Education: University of South Carolina (B.S.)

Annie E. McDaniel is an American politician. She is a member of the South Carolina House of Representatives from the 41st District, serving since 2018. She is a member of the Democratic party.

McDaniel serves as 1st Vice Chair of the House Operations and Management Committee, and as a member of the Agricultural, Natural Resources and Environmental Affairs Committee. She is the current Chair of the South Carolina Legislative Black Caucus.

McDaniel attended the 2024 Democratic National Convention as a Fifth Congressional District delegate.
