= Gene Brown (politician) =

American politician

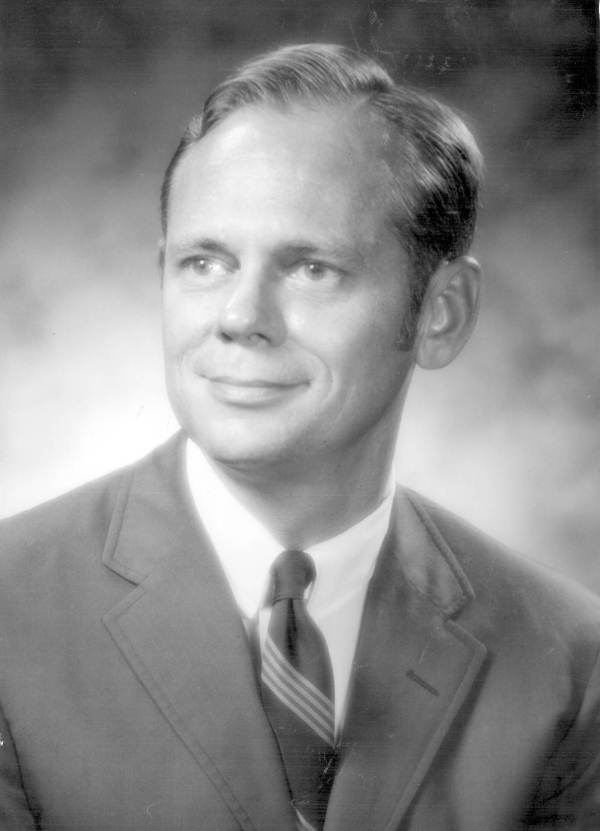

Member of the Florida House of Representatives from the 32nd district
- In office 1970–1972

Personal details
- Born: Lloyd Eugene Brown; May 10, 1933 Ocala, Florida, U.S.
- Died: August 19, 1996 (aged 63) Ocala, Florida, U.S.
- Education: University of Florida
- Occupation: attorney

Lloyd Eugene Brown (May 10, 1933 – August 19, 1996) was a politician in the American state of Florida. He served in the Florida House of Representatives from 1972 to 1974, representing the 32nd district.
