= 1964 Democratic Party presidential primaries =

Selection of the Democratic Party nominee

- March 10 to June 2, 1964
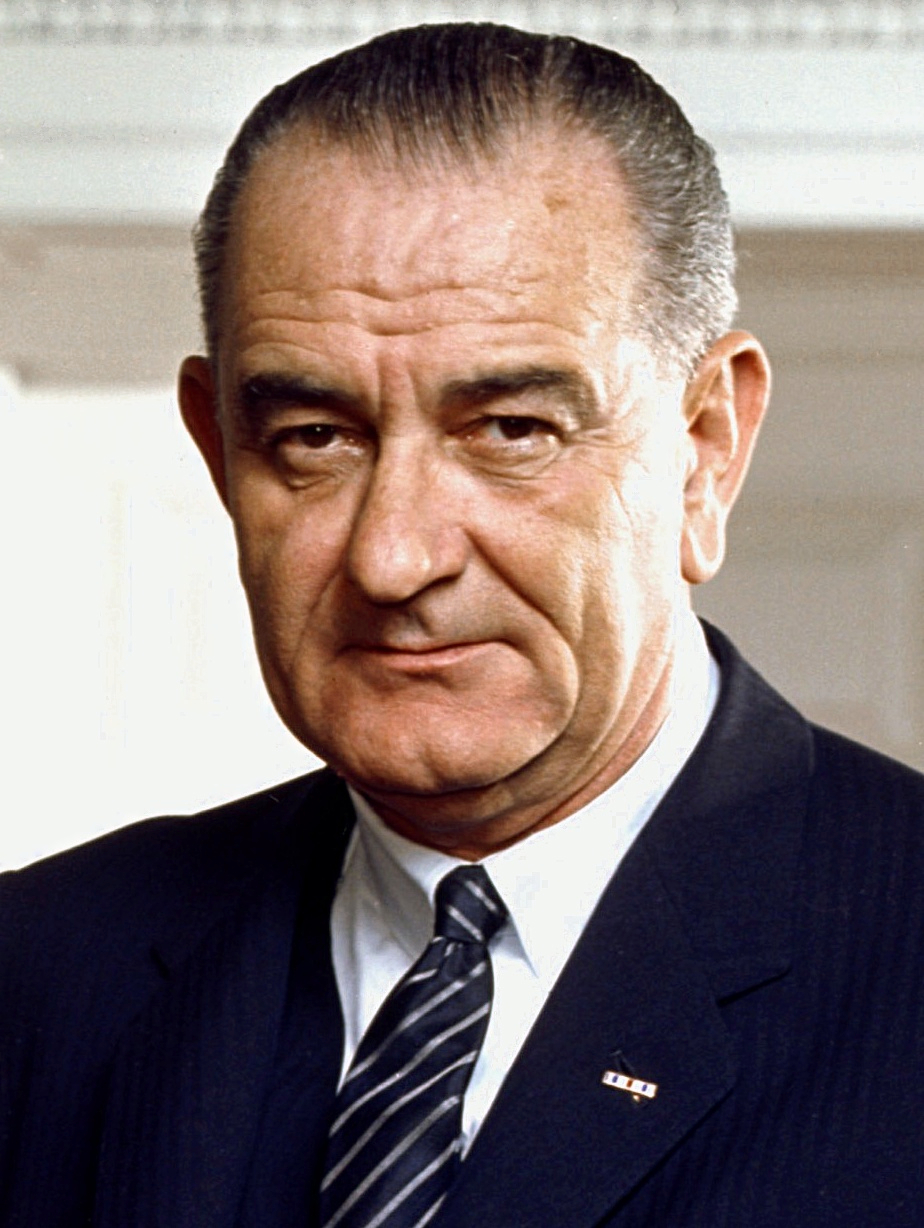

Candidate	Lyndon B. Johnson	George Wallace
Home state	Texas	Alabama
Contests won	9 (Note: With surrogates: 15)	0
Popular vote	1,106,999 (Note: With surrogates: 5,133,021)	672,984
Percentage	17.8% (Note: With surrogates: 88.41%)	10.8%
- Gold denotes a state won by Daniel Brewster. Purple denotes a state won by Pat Brown. Green denotes a state won by Lyndon B. Johnson. Blue denotes a state won by Albert S. Porter. Orange denotes a state won by Jennings Randolph. Brown denotes a state won by John W. Reynolds. Pink denotes a state won by Matthew E. Welsh. Black denotes a state won by unpledged delegates. Grey denotes a state that did not hold a primary.
Previous Democratic nominee
John F. Kennedy
Democratic nominee
Lyndon B. Johnson

From March 10 to June 2, 1964, voters of the Democratic Party chose its nominee for president in the 1964 United States presidential election. Incumbent President Lyndon B. Johnson was selected as the nominee through a series of primary elections and caucuses culminating in the 1964 Democratic National Convention held from August 24 to August 27, 1964, in Atlantic City, New Jersey.

== Democratic Primary Race ==
Johnson became president of the United States upon the assassination of John F. Kennedy in 1963, and the goodwill generated by the incident gave him tremendous popularity. In the 1964 presidential primaries for the Democratic Party, Johnson faced no real opposition, yet he insisted until near the time of the Democratic National Convention that he remained undecided about seeking a full term. Johnson's supporters in the sixteen primary states and Washington, D.C. thus ran write-in campaigns or had favorite son candidates run in Johnson's place.

Only two potential candidates threatened Johnson's attempts to unite the party. The first was Governor George Wallace of Alabama, who had recently come to prominence with his Stand in the Schoolhouse Door in defiance of the court-ordered desegregation of the University of Alabama. Wallace appeared on the ballot in Wisconsin, Indiana, and Maryland; while he lost all three primaries, he surpassed all expectations, and his performance set the stage for his 1968 third-party run. The other potential contender was Attorney General Robert F. Kennedy, who polls showed was a heavy favorite to be Johnson's running mate. Johnson and Kennedy disliked one another intensely, and although Johnson worried he might need Kennedy to defeat a moderate Republican ticket, he ultimately announced that none of his cabinet members would be selected as his running mate.

As the 1964 nomination was considered a foregone conclusion, the primaries received little press attention outside of Wallace's entry into the race. Despite threats of an independent run in the general election, Wallace withdrew his candidacy in the summer of 1964 because of a lack of support. Johnson announced Hubert Humphrey as his vice-presidential choice at the 1964 Democratic Convention and went on to win a landslide election against Goldwater in November.

== Background ==
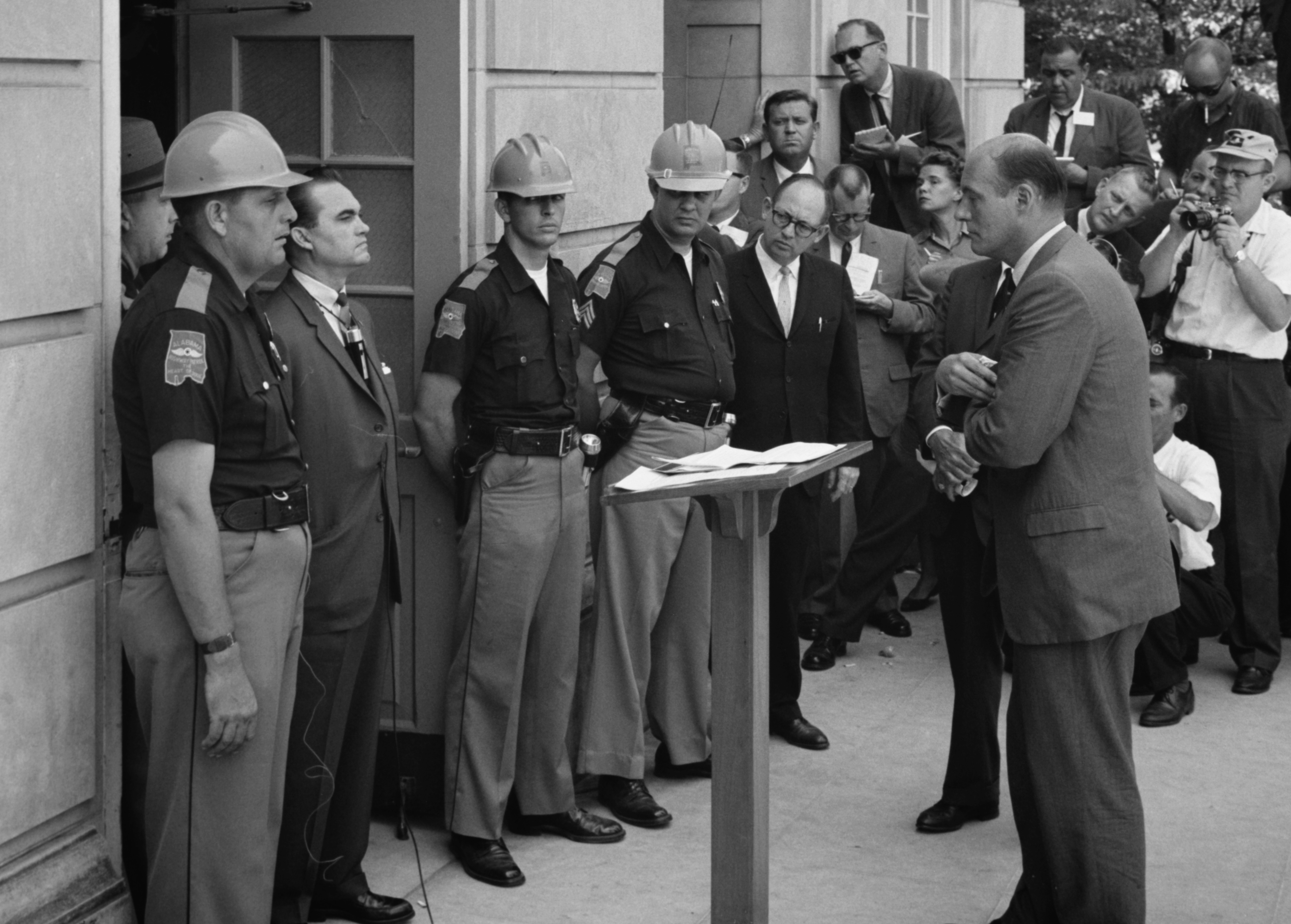
George Wallace (center left) and the Stand in the Schoolhouse Door, blocking integration at the University of Alabama

The goodwill generated by the assassination of Kennedy incident gave Johnson tremendous popularity. He enjoyed strong support against the bitterly divided Republicans; polls in January 1964 showed him leading Republican challengers Barry Goldwater 75% to 20% and Nelson Rockefeller 74% to 17%. However, Wallace had received over 100,000 letters and telegrams of support, nearly half from non-southerners, following his 1963 Stand in the Schoolhouse Door in defiance of a court order to integrate the University of Alabama, and he subsequently became "Tennyson's Mordred, exposing the dark side of Camelot". He began a national speaking tour with a well-received lecture at Harvard on November 7, 1963, bringing him additional notoriety as he flirted with the idea of a national campaign. Wallace's charm and candor won over many of his critics; during a question and answer session at Harvard, a black man asserted his intention to run for president, to which Wallace smiled and responded, "Between you and me both, we might get rid of that crowd in Washington. We might even run on the same ticket." Meanwhile, Johnson forbade discussion of politics in the White House and refused to comment on whether he would run in the 1964 election, instead pursuing the late Kennedy's legislative agenda (most notably the Civil Rights Act of 1964), managing the Vietnam War, and declaring his own War on Poverty.

Despite condemnation from media outlets — in 1965, when reporter Theodore H. White published The Making of the President, 1964, he referred to Wallace as a "narrow-minded, grotesquely provincial man" — Wallace's opposition to the Civil Rights Act, which he based upon states' rights, represented what pundits and analysts began referring to as backlash, specifically white backlash. Coined in summer 1963 to refer to the possibility that white workers, when forced to compete with their black colleagues in a shrinking job market, might "lash back", backlash came to be associated with whites' ability to do so in the voting booth in the face of racial tension, as they had done with the repeal of the Rumford Fair Housing Act in California. A series of riots over civil rights in cities throughout the U.S., notably in Cambridge, Maryland, and the Black Power movement further heightened the tension on which Wallace was able to capitalize. Wallace's connection with the alienated workingman would later manifest itself in the concept of the so-called "silent majority".

== Primaries ==
Timeline:
Date	State(s)
March 10	New Hampshire
April 7	Wisconsin
April 14	Illinois
April 21	New Jersey
April 28	Massachusetts
May 2	Texas^{1}
May 5	District of Columbia, Indiana, Ohio
May 12	Nebraska, West Virginia
May 15	Oregon
May 19	Maryland
May 26	Florida
June 2	California, North Dakota
^{1} No primary was authorized on the Democratic side; the Republicans held their primary as scheduled.

At the time, the transition from traditional party conventions to the modern presidential primary was still in progress, and only sixteen states and the District of Columbia held primaries for the 1964 election. Despite Johnson's very real doubts about running, his candidacy was never in question to the general public. Indeed, in several states, "unpledged delegates" was the only option on the ballot for the Democratic primary. Amid a Republican Party that struggled to find a candidate and the protests of African Americans over civil rights, the Democratic primaries received relatively scant national attention outside Wallace's entry into the race.

Although Johnson faced no real opposition for the Democratic nomination, a plan had been hatched by a number of southerners to run favorite son candidates in the general election in an attempt to send the Electoral College vote to the House of Representatives under the Twelfth Amendment. One of the two major parties would then be forced to make concessions, particularly on the issue of civil rights. This plan never materialized, but on May 5, 1964, voters in Alabama voted by a five-to-one margin for a slate of unpledged electors controlled by Wallace, which prevented Johnson's name from appearing on the ballot in the general election. A similar slate of unpledged electors appeared on the ballot alongside Johnson and Barry Goldwater, the eventual Republican nominee, in Mississippi; Goldwater won both states in the general election. Wallace's third-party run in 1968 would have a similar premise, aiming not to win but to force one of the two major parties to make concessions, and nearly succeeded in throwing the election.

=== The "Bobby problem" ===
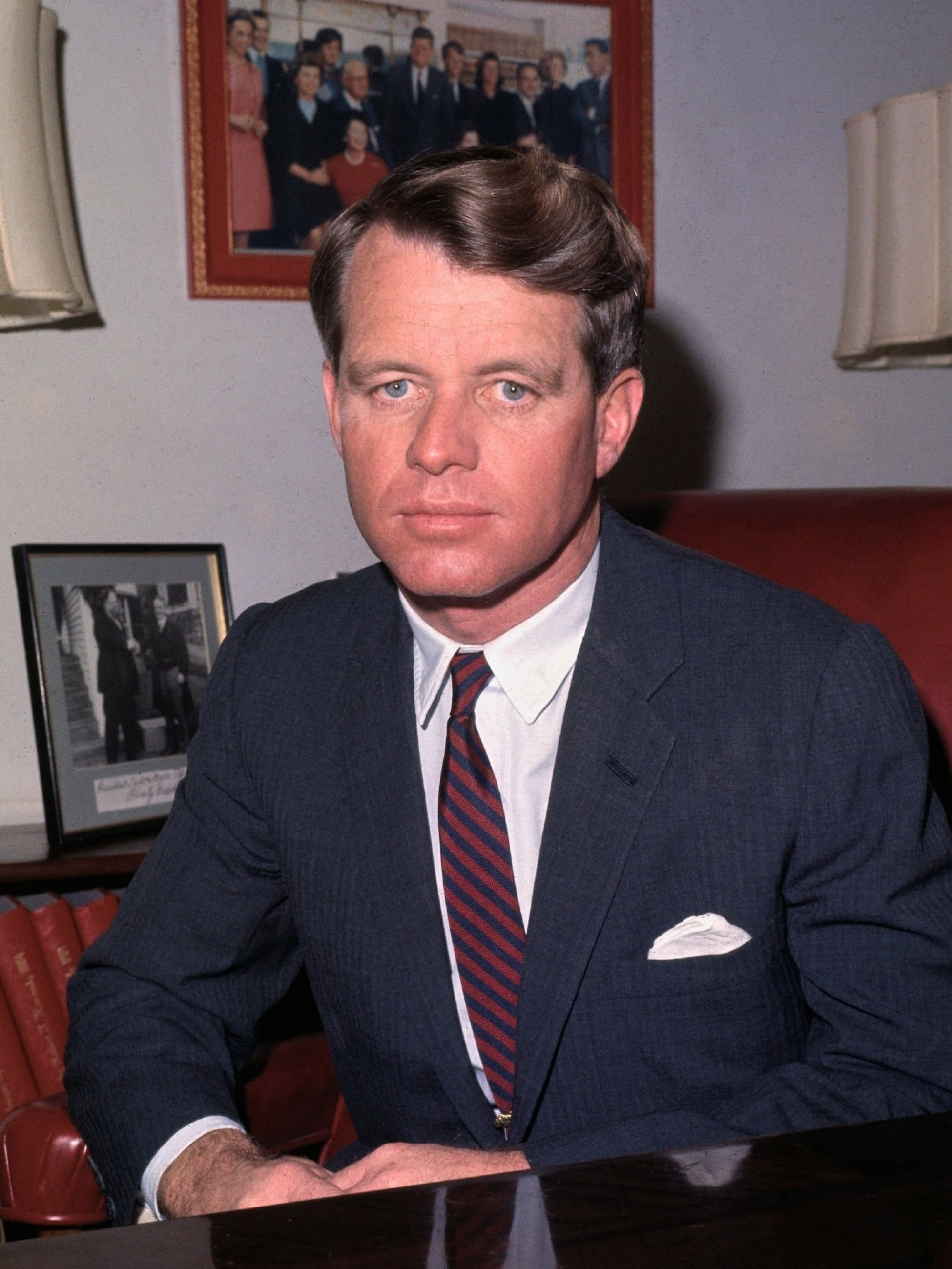
Robert F. Kennedy

Johnson faced pressure from some within the Democratic Party to name Robert F. Kennedy, the late President Kennedy's younger brother and the U.S. Attorney General, as his vice-presidential choice, which Johnson staffers referred to internally as the "Bobby problem". Kennedy and Johnson had disliked one another since the 1960 Democratic National Convention, where Kennedy tried to prevent Johnson from becoming his brother's running mate; moreover, Johnson wished to form his own legacy rather than being perceived as a "lame duck". Although Johnson confided to aides on several occasions that he might be forced to accept Kennedy in order to secure a victory over a moderate Republican ticket such as Governor of New York Nelson Rockefeller and the popular Ambassador to South Vietnam Henry Cabot Lodge Jr., Kennedy supporters attempted to force the issue by running a draft movement during the write-in New Hampshire primary. This movement gained momentum after Governor John W. King's endorsement and infuriated Johnson. Kennedy received 25,094 votes for vice president in New Hampshire, far surpassing Hubert Humphrey, the next highest name and eventual nominee.

The potential need for a Johnson–Kennedy ticket was ultimately eliminated by the Republican nomination of conservative Barry Goldwater. With Goldwater as his opponent, Johnson's choice of vice president was all but irrelevant; opinion polls had revealed that, while Kennedy was an overwhelming first choice among Democrats, any choice made less than a 2% difference in a general election that already promised to be a landslide. When attempts to ease Kennedy out of the running failed, Johnson searched for a way to eliminate him with minimal party discord, and eventually announced that none of his cabinet members would be considered for the position. Kennedy instead mounted a successful run for United States Senate in New York.

=== Wisconsin ===
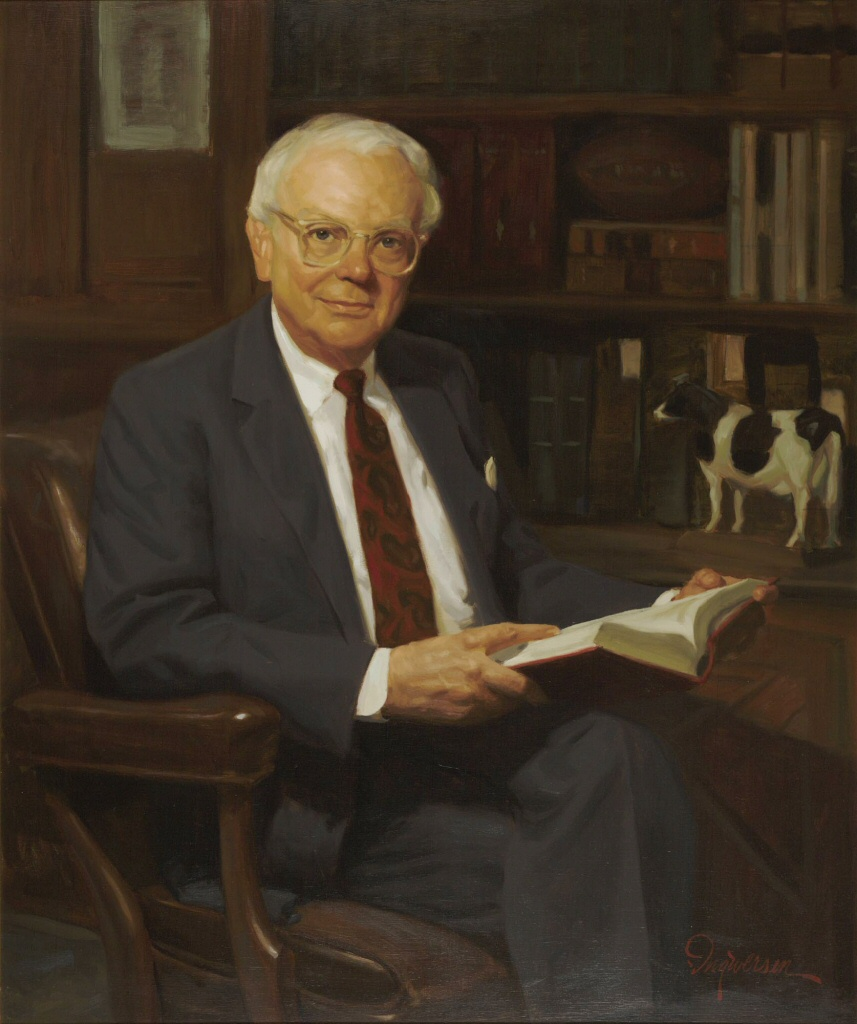
Governor John W. Reynolds ran in Johnson's place in Wisconsin.

Wallace had hinted at a possible run numerous times, telling one reporter, "If I ran outside the South and got 10%, it would be a victory. It would shake their eyeteeth in Washington." However, when Milwaukee publicist Lloyd Herbstreith and his wife Dolores attended a Wallace speech at the University of Wisconsin–Madison on February 19, 1964, they were reportedly so moved that they began a drive to place Wallace's name on the ballot in the April 7 primary, a relatively simple procedure requiring a qualified slate of sixty electors to represent the state's congressional districts and at-large votes. When Johnson's surrogate, Governor John W. Reynolds, was asked about the prospect of a Wallace run, he jocularly deferred all questions to Dolores Herbstreith, which gave the Herbstreiths newfound publicity and easily allowed them to beat the March 6 filing deadline. On the day of the deadline, Wallace returned to Wisconsin to announce his candidacy, the Confederate flags and "Stand Up For Alabama" slogan on his airplane were replaced with American flags and "Stand Up For America".

Reynolds continued to dismiss Wallace's candidacy, which was denounced by media outlets, clergy, trade unions such as the AFL–CIO, and even Wallace's own party. According to J. Louis Hanson, chair of the state Democratic Party, "Given the state election laws in Wisconsin, any kook—and I consider him a kook—can cause trouble. This man is being supported by extreme right-wing elements who are probably kookier than he is." In an attempt to drum up support for his own cause, Reynolds told a group of supporters at one point that it would be a catastrophe if Wallace received 100,000 votes. Wallace went on to receive 266,000 votes, or one-third of the 780,000 Democratic votes cast, and would later observe that "there must have been three catastrophes in Wisconsin."

Wallace's strong showing was due in part to his appeal to ethnic neighborhoods made up of immigrants from countries such as Poland, Czechoslovakia, Hungary and Yugoslavia. Despite initial apprehension about campaigning in these communities, Wallace biographer Stephen Lesher credits him with recognizing that they were "powerfully attracted to the message that the civil rights bill might adversely affect their jobs, their property values, the makeup of their neighborhoods, and children's schools". Others note that Wallace's anti-Communist message resonated with communities whose home countries were behind the Iron Curtain of the Soviet Union, and a series of blunders by the Reynolds campaign added to an existing resentment of Reynolds' tax policies and a recently passed housing law. "What Reynolds and most commentators would miss," Lesher writes, was that Dolores Herbstreith, who had never participated in politics until she became the de facto Wallace campaign chair in the state, was "neither a racist nor a crazy ... less interested in race and the Communist menace than in sowing conservative seeds that began sprouting with Barry Goldwater later that year and flowered with Ronald Reagan in the 1980s."

=== Indiana ===
Wallace support among Democratic voters in Indiana, from the bottom quartile (lightest) to the top (darkest)

Wallace next appeared on the ballot in Indiana, which had a long history of Ku Klux Klan activity, against Governor Matthew E. Welsh, who was running specifically so that Wallace would not be unopposed. Welsh considered Wallace a formidable opponent and took no chances, manipulating party machinery and arranging for a photograph of himself shaking hands with President Johnson; meanwhile, the Democratic State Committee began a $75,000 advertising campaign on his behalf. Welsh stumped across the state touting his civil rights credentials and denigrating Wallace. His slogan was "Clear the way for LBJ, vote Welsh the fifth of May." He also benefited from the fact that Indiana at the time had a unique type of closed primary which technically allowed Republicans to vote for Wallace but required them to sign an affidavit that they would vote for the Democrat in the general election.

As Wallace excoriated what he called "sweeping federal encroachment" on the gradual process of desegregation, described the Civil Rights Act as a "back-door open-occupancy bill", and appeared alongside a popular Catholic bishop in support of a constitutional amendment to allow school prayer, tension continued to mount. Senator Ted Kennedy made a stop in the state to denounce him, and both of Indiana's Democratic senators campaigned against him. At a speaking engagement at the University of Notre Dame, Wallace was interrupted when nearly 500 of the 5,000-member audience began heckling him while protesters outside sang the civil rights anthem "We Shall Overcome". During the campaign, Welsh took part in a Civil War Centennial Tour wherein he visited the capitals of each of the southern states, except Alabama, and held official ceremonies to return the Confederate battle flags captured by Hoosier soldiers during the American Civil War. Wallace refused to hold such a ceremony and Alabama's captured battle flags still remain on display in the Indiana World War Memorial.

Wallace received nearly 30% of the vote, below some expectations but nonetheless startling given the level of opposition. The total was 376,023 to 172,646 votes — Wallace's worst showing in any state.

In an article in The British Journal of Sociology, Michael Rogin observed a heavy correlation between significant African American populations and white support for Wallace, similar to patterns that had long been observed in the Southern United States. He found a belt running through the northern part of the state near Gary (at the time, Indiana's African-American population made up 6% of the state, compared to 45-50% in Gary), where Wallace consistently received overwhelming support across class lines from whites. A notable exception was the Jewish vote. He also found a Bible Belt of moderate-sized cities running through central Indiana where, despite a negligible black population, Wallace similarly dominated the Fundamentalist Christian white vote.

=== Maryland ===
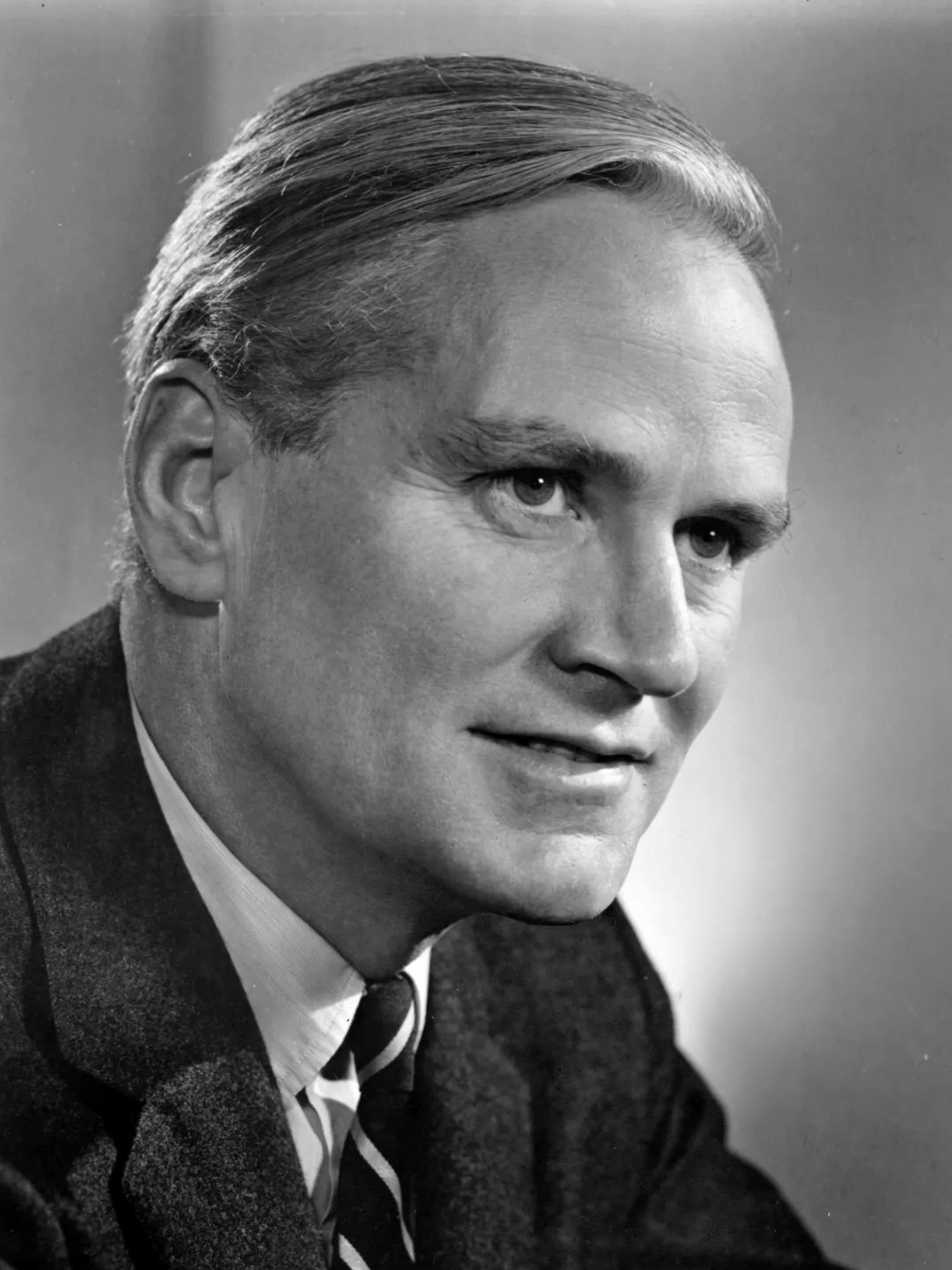
Senator Daniel Brewster ran in Johnson's place in Maryland.

Racially polarized Maryland was Wallace's best showing. There the Johnson supporters struggled to find a suitable candidate after Governor J. Millard Tawes stepped aside for fear that his past support of civil rights and a recent increase in the state income tax would compromise his candidacy. Junior Senator Daniel Brewster stepped in at the last minute at Johnson's request. Once again, religious and labor leaders (in the latter case, the AFL-CIO again found itself at odds with many of its members), the press, and even Milton Eisenhower, brother of former President Dwight D. Eisenhower, lined up against Wallace, and a number of popular senators, including Edward M. Kennedy, Birch Bayh, Frank Church, Daniel Inouye, and Abraham Ribicoff, and popular former Baltimore Mayor Thomas D'Alesandro Jr. who was the father of future Speaker of the House Nancy Pelosi and then-City Council President Thomas D'Alesandro III who went onto become Mayor as well in 1967 and campaigned himself in the Italian wards of Baltimore on Brewster's behalf.

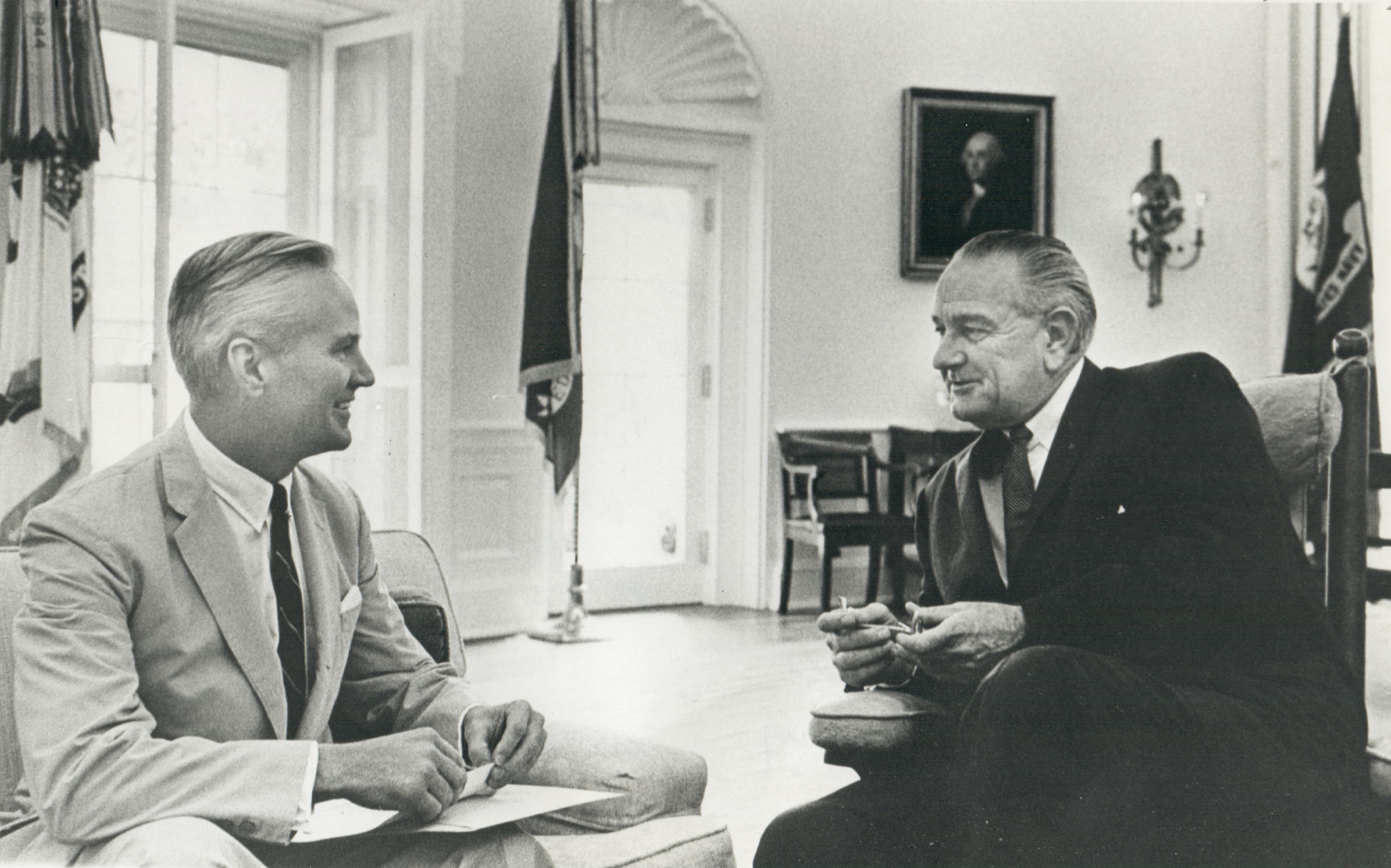
After Senator Daniel Brewster defeated Governor George Wallace in the Maryland presidential primary, President Johnson invited Brewster to the Oval Office to thank him for running as the President’s surrogate. A political cartoon by Richard Yardley celebrating Daniel Brewster’s victory over George Wallace in the Maryland primary characterizes Wallace’s defeat with Fort McHenry as the backdrop.

Although race played a significant factor in Wallace's support elsewhere, his strength in Maryland came from the galvanized Eastern Shore, where some estimates put his support among whites as high as 90%. Riots in Cambridge had erupted over the repeal of an equal access law, and as the rioters clashed with the National Guard, civil rights leader Gloria Richardson led peaceful demonstrations against the measure. At the behest of aid Bill Jones, Wallace reluctantly kept a speaking engagement in Cambridge, where he was confronted by some 500 black protesters. When a baby was thought to have died from the tear gas used by police, it seemed a public relations disaster to the Wallace campaign, but the coroner's report concluded the baby had died of a congenital heart defect. Opponents nonetheless attempted to use the incident and the neo-Nazi National States' Rights Party's description of Wallace as the "last chance for the white voter" against him, but Wallace continued to gain momentum, and The Baltimore Sun observed the distinct possibility that he would win the state.

With voter turnout up by 40%, nearly 500,000 votes were cast, of which Brewster received 53% to Wallace's 43%. Wallace, who won outright among white voters, reportedly said, "If it hadn't been for the nigger bloc vote, we'd have won it all." Indeed, Wallace won 15 of Maryland's 23 counties, and only a combination of double the usual African-American turnout and liberal votes from Montgomery and Prince George's Counties prevented a Wallace victory.

== Candidates ==
The following political leaders were candidates for the 1964 Democratic presidential nomination:

=== Nominee ===
Candidate	Most recent office	Home state	Campaign Withdrawal date	Popular vote	Contests won	Running mate
Lyndon B. Johnson	President of the United States (1963–1969)	Texas	(Campaign); Secured nomination: August 27, 1964	1,106,999 (17.8%)	9	Hubert Humphrey

=== Other major candidates ===
These candidates participated in multiple state primaries or were included in multiple major national polls.

Candidate	Most recent office	Home state	Campaign Withdrawal date	Popular vote	Contests won
George Wallace	Governor of Alabama (1963–1967, 1971–1979, 1983–1987)	Alabama	(Campaign)	672,984 (10.8%)	0

== Results ==
	State	Lyndon Johnson (including surrogates)	Robert F. Kennedy	George Wallace	Unpledged	Others
March 10	New Hampshire	95.26%	1.58%			3.16%
April 7	Wisconsin	66.25%		33.75%
April 14	Illinois	91.63%	3.23%	4.20%		0.94%
April 21	New Jersey	82.30%		8.31%		9.39%
April 28	Massachusetts	72.91%	18.96%	0.68%		7.45%
April 28	Pennsylvania	82.77%	4.75%	4.78%		7.67%
May 5	Indiana	64.94%		29.82%
May 5	Ohio	100.00%
May 5	Washington, D.C.				100.00%
May 12	Nebraska	89.30%		1.74%		8.96%
May 12	West Virginia	100.00%
May 15	Oregon	99.50%		0.50%
May 19	Maryland	53.14%		42.75%		4.11%
May 26	Florida	100.00%
June 2	California	100.00%
June 2	North Dakota				100.00%

Candidates:

- President Lyndon B. Johnson - 1,106,999 (17.7%)
- George Wallace - 672,984 (10.8%)

Johnson surrogates:

- Unpledged delegates - 2,705,290 (43.3%)
- John W. Reynolds - 522,405 (8.4%)
- Albert S. Porter - 493,619 (7.9%)
- Matthew E. Welsh - 376,023 (6.0%)
- Daniel Brewster - 267,106 (4.3%)

Write-ins:

- Robert F. Kennedy - 36,258 (0.5%)
- Henry Cabot Lodge - 8,495 (0.1%)
- William W. Scranton - 8,156 (0.1%)
- Edward M. Kennedy - 1,065 (<0.1%)
- Others - 50,224 (0.8%)

In the state of California, two slates of unpledged delegates appeared on the ballot. The slate controlled by Pat Brown received 1,693,813 votes (68%), while the slate controlled by Sam Yorty received 798,431 votes (32%). In West Virginia, where Jennings Randolph campaigned on Johnson's behalf, the only option on the ballot was "unpledged delegates at large", which received 131,432 votes (100%). South Dakota and the District of Columbia similarly had unpledged delegates as the only option. Wallace notably received 12,104 votes in Pennsylvania and 3,751 votes in Illinois despite visiting neither state, although Kennedy received a comparable portion of the vote in both states.

== Vice-presidential choice and Wallace's withdrawal ==
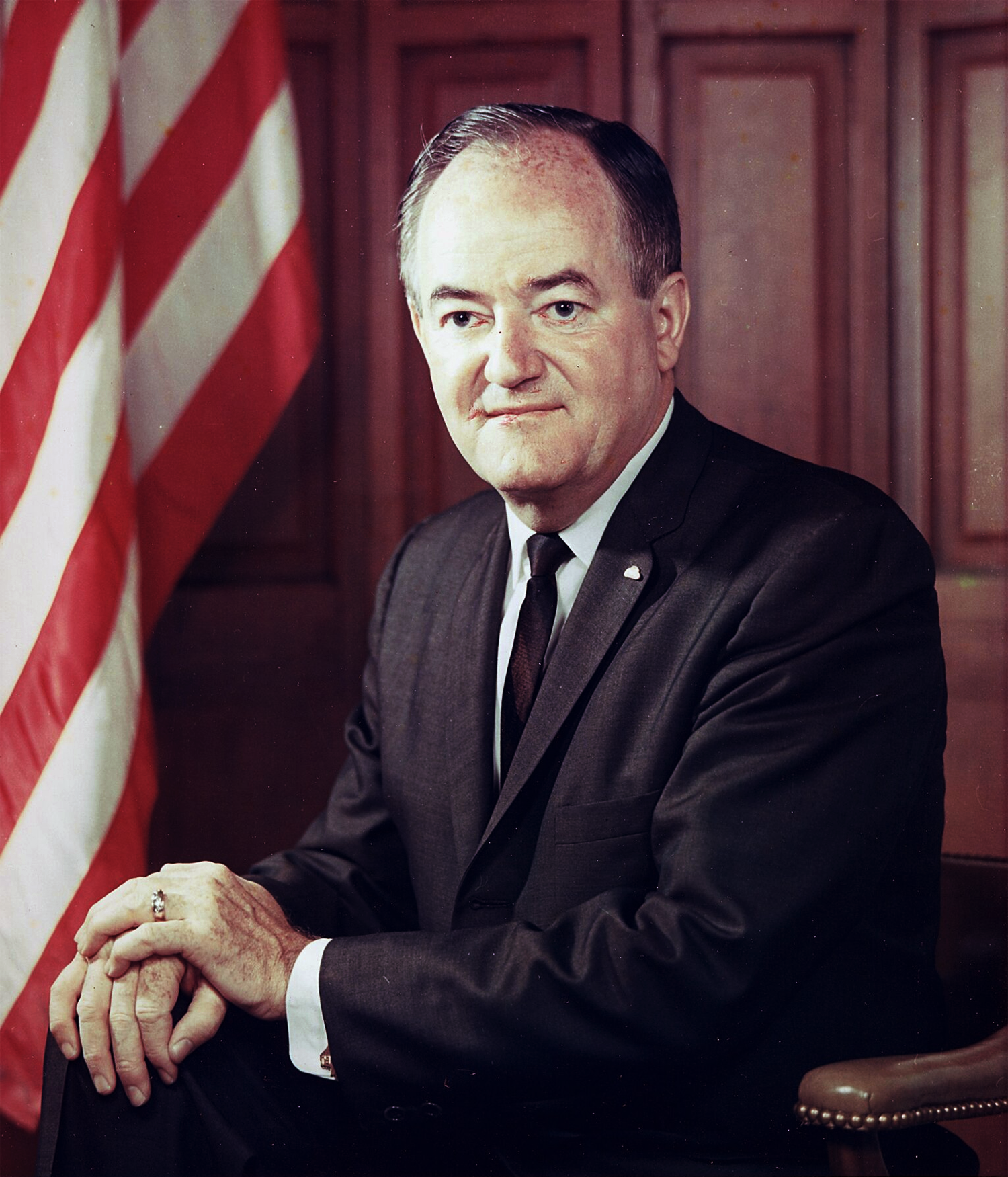
Hubert Humphrey, Johnson's vice presidential running mate

With Robert F. Kennedy out of the way, the question of Johnson's choice of running mate provided some suspense for an otherwise uneventful convention. However, Johnson also became concerned that Kennedy might use a scheduled speech at the 1964 Democratic Convention to create a groundswell of emotion among the delegates to nominate him as Johnson's running mate; Johnson prevented this by scheduling Kennedy's speech on the last day of the convention, by which time the vice-presidential nomination would have been made. Shortly after the convention, Kennedy decided to leave Johnson's cabinet and run for the U.S. Senate in New York, where he won the general election in November. Johnson chose Senator Hubert Humphrey of Minnesota, a liberal and civil rights activist, as his running mate.

Meanwhile, the Republicans had nominated the conservative Goldwater, who shared Wallace's opposition to the Civil Rights Act on the basis of states' rights and found considerable support among southerners. This caused a precipitous drop in support for Wallace's threatened general election campaign, and on June 18, Wallace biographer Dan T. Carter notes that Goldwater gave "a brief speech which — in substance if not tone — could have been written by George Wallace." By July 13, Gallup polls showed that Wallace support in a general election match-up had plummeted to below 3% outside the south. Even in the south, he polled third in a three-way race against Johnson and Goldwater. Goldwater reportedly welcomed Wallace's support but firmly refused him a spot as vice-presidential candidate. With a conservative already facing off against Johnson, Wallace stayed his nascent plans for a third-party run until the 1968 election, ending his campaign with an appearance on Face the Nation on July 19; however, he did not endorse Goldwater. In the general election, Goldwater repudiated Wallace and denied courting his vote, which Wallace took as a personal insult.

== Convention ==
Despite his insistence that he remained undecided about running, Johnson had meticulously planned the convention to ensure it went smoothly. Aside from a minor controversy over the Mississippi delegation (see Mississippi Freedom Democratic Party), the convention went as planned; in keeping with the speech he gave after Kennedy's assassination, Johnson chose "Let Us Continue" as the motto, and the theme song was a take on "Hello Dolly!" sung by Carol Channing entitled "Hello, Lyndon!" Governors Pat Brown of California and John Connally of Texas formally nominated Johnson.

Johnson went on to win the general election in a landslide, only losing the Deep South states of Louisiana, Alabama, Mississippi, Georgia, and South Carolina, as well as Goldwater's home state of Arizona.

== See also ==
- 1964 Republican Party presidential primaries
- Lyndon B. Johnson 1964 presidential campaign
