= 1964 Democratic National Convention =

U.S. political event held in Atlantic City, New Jersey

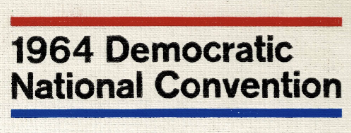
- 1964 presidential election

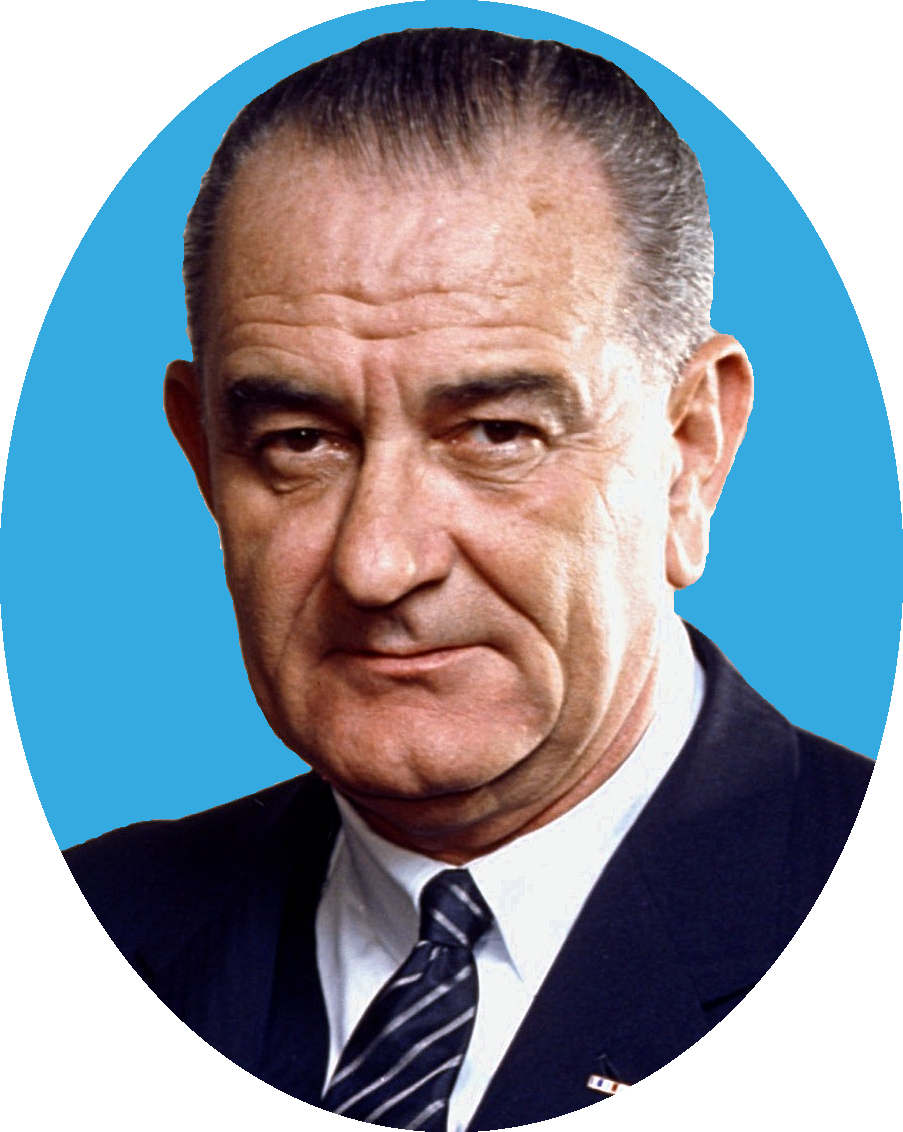
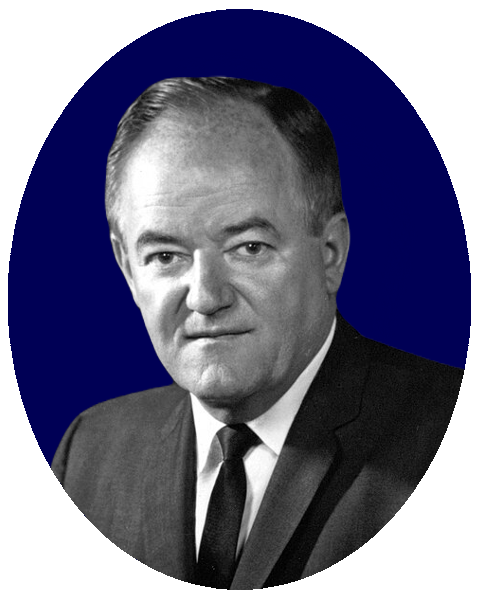
- Nominees; Johnson and Humphrey

Convention
- Dates: August 24–27, 1964
- City: Atlantic City, New Jersey
- Venue: Convention Center

Candidates
- Presidential nominee: Lyndon B. Johnson of Texas
- Vice-presidential nominee: Hubert Humphrey of Minnesota

The 1964 Democratic National Convention of the Democratic Party, took place at Boardwalk Hall in Atlantic City, New Jersey, from August 24 to 27, 1964. President Lyndon B. Johnson was nominated for a full term. Senator Hubert H. Humphrey of Minnesota was nominated for vice president. The convention took place less than a year after President John F. Kennedy was assassinated in Dallas, Texas, and Kennedy's legacy was present throughout the convention.

Johnson, fearing that civil rights activists at the convention would undermine his chances of success, ordered his longtime friend, FBI director J. Edgar Hoover, to "keep an eye on things", resulting in the latter wiretapping, bugging, and infiltrating civil rights groups present there.

The convention's first day featured the Keynote speech by Senator John O. Pastore, of Rhode Island, where he spoke passionately of the party's success and in remembrance of President Kennedy. Pastore was later featured on the cover of The New York Times and Life magazine for the success of the address.

On the last day of the convention, Kennedy's brother Attorney General Robert F. Kennedy introduced a short film in honor of his brother's memory. After Kennedy appeared on the convention floor, delegates erupted in 22 minutes of uninterrupted applause, causing him to nearly break into tears. Speaking about his brother's vision for the country, Robert Kennedy quoted from Romeo and Juliet: "When he shall die, take him and cut him out into the stars, and he shall make the face of heaven so fine that all the world will be in love with night and pay no worship to the garish sun."

Adlai E. Stevenson II, Ambassador to the United Nations and twice a Democratic nominee for president, received a short, but polite ovation before introducing a memorial film the same day for former First Lady Eleanor Roosevelt, who had died on November 7, 1962. By August 26, 1964, 14,000 retirees from the N. C. S. C. (National Council Of Senior Citizens) arrived at the convention, to encourage President Johnson to extend public health insurance to millions of Americans. In July 1965, Medicare was signed into law in front of former President Harry S. Truman, whose push for N. H. I. (National Health Insurance) had collapsed, nearly two decades earlier.

== Mississippi controversy ==
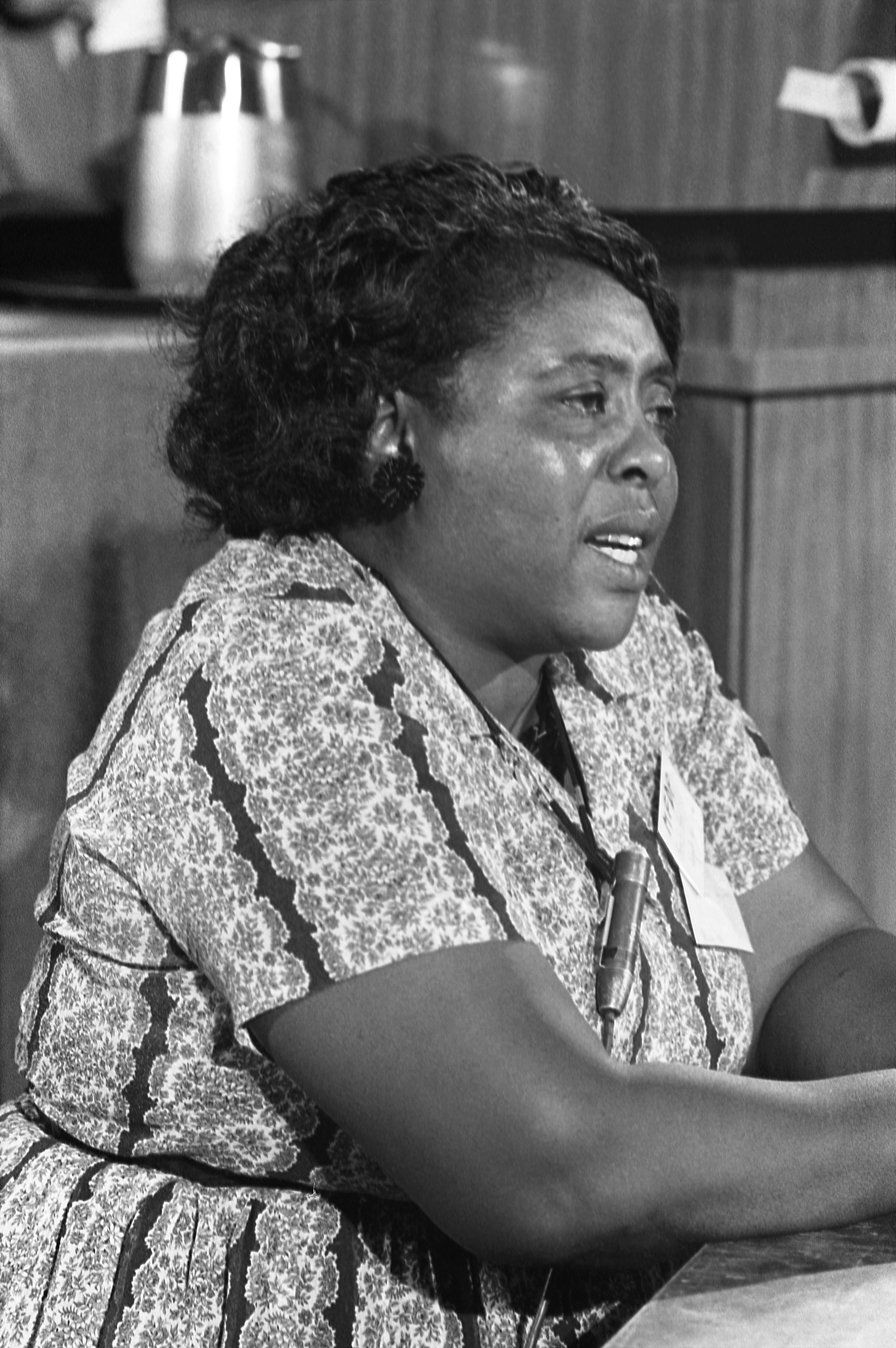
Fannie Lou Hamer, mid-speech to the credentials committee

At the national convention the integrated Mississippi Freedom Democratic Party (MFDP) claimed the seats for delegates for Mississippi, on the grounds that the official Mississippi delegation had been elected in violation of the party's rules because blacks had been systematically excluded from voting in the primaries, and participating in the precinct and county caucuses and the state convention; whereas the MFDP delegates had all been elected in strict compliance with party rules. The MFDP prepared a legal brief detailing the reasons why the "regular" Mississippi delegation did not adequately represent their state's residents, including the tactics employed to exclude participation by Black citizens. Jack Minnis wrote, "MFDP, with the help of SNCC, produced brochures, mimeographed biographies of the MFDP delegates, histories of the MFDP, legal arguments, historical arguments, moral arguments" that were distributed to all of the convention's delegates. The Democratic Party referred the challenge to the convention credentials committee. The MFDP delegates lobbied and argued their case, and large groups of supporters and volunteers established an around-the-clock picket line on the boardwalk just outside the convention.

The credentials committee televised its proceedings, which allowed the nation to see and hear the testimony of the MFDP delegates, particularly the testimony of vice-chairperson Fannie Lou Hamer. She gave a moving and evocative portrayal of her hard brutalized life as a sharecropper on a cotton plantation in the Mississippi Delta and the retaliation inflicted on her for trying to register to vote.

The party's liberal leaders, led by Congresswoman Edith Green supported an even division of the seats between the two delegations. But Johnson was concerned that, while the regular Democrats of Mississippi would probably vote for Goldwater anyway, rejecting them would lose him the South. Eventually, Hubert Humphrey, Walter Reuther and the black civil rights leaders including Roy Wilkins and Bayard Rustin worked out a compromise: two of the 68 MFDP delegates chosen by Johnson would be made at-large delegates and the remainder would be non-voting guests of the convention; the regular Mississippi delegation was required to pledge to support the party ticket; and no future Democratic convention would accept a delegation chosen by a discriminatory poll.

Joseph Rauh, the MFDP's lawyer, initially refused this deal, but eventually urged the MFDP to accept it. But the MFDP delegates refused because by accepting the official all-white Mississippi delegation, the party validated a process in which blacks had been denied their constitutional right to vote and participate in the political process. They felt that because the MFDP had conducted their delegate selection process according to the party rules, they should be seated as the Mississippi delegation, not just a token two of them as at-large delegates. Many civil rights activists were deeply offended by the convention's outcome. As leader (and later Representative) John Lewis said, "We had played by the rules, done everything we were supposed to do, had played the game exactly as required, had arrived at the doorstep and found the door slammed in our face."

Many white delegates from Mississippi and Alabama refused to sign any pledge, and left the convention. In all, "43 of the 53 members of the Alabama delegation . . . refused to pledge their support for the national ticket of Johnson and Hubert Humphrey and were denied seating."

== Negative media coverage of Atlantic City ==
The convention was intended to boost Atlantic City's image as a premier travel destination in the United States. Instead the DNC exposed the decline of the city. Atlantic City faced criticism for poor quality hotels and the streets and buildings were dirty. The decrepitude of Atlantic City was particularly present in comparison to San Francisco, California, an emerging city, that was the host city of the earlier-held 1964 Republican National Convention that members of the media had also attended. In addition to the reportedly rude service visitors faced from hospitality service workers, by 1964 the city's hotel facilities were baring visible signs of age and upkeep that was reflective of the decline in tourism that the city was experiencing. This left visitors with a less than stellar impression of the city. With no contested ballot to preoccupy their coverage, members of the news media spent time expressing their grievances about what they considered to be poor hospitality in Atlantic City.

In 1996, Carla Linz of The Press of Atlantic City recalled,

In 1964...Atlantic revealed itself as seedy, rundown, and ill-equipped to host the Democratic National Convention that year...Atlantic City could testify to the gamble of hosting a national political convention: You can't buy that kind of national publicity when things go right. And you can't shed it when they go wrong...In 1964, bad publicity about Atlantic City — about dirty hotel rooms, rude service and a "queen of resorts" that had become a sea hag — stuck to the city's image. Some say the convention hastened the city's decline.

In 2014, Chuck Darrow of the Philadelphia Inquirer wrote an article which credited the convention with causing harm to Atlantic City's reputation. With a damaged reputation and a continuing decline, the city subsequently pivoted to attempt to revive itself by becoming an East Coast hub for casinos and gambling.

== Nominations ==
Johnson's entire acceptance speech, delivered upon receiving the nomination

President Johnson announced his long-expected candidacy for a full term just days before the convention started. The favorite son candidates who had run in his place then withdrew, his name was the only one placed in nomination, and for the last time, the presidential roll-call vote was dispensed with. Johnson was nominated by voice vote.

The Balloting:

Democratic National Convention presidential vote, 1964
Candidates	
Name	Lyndon B. Johnson
Certified Votes	Voice Vote (100.00%)
Margin	0 (0.00%)

=== The vice presidency ===
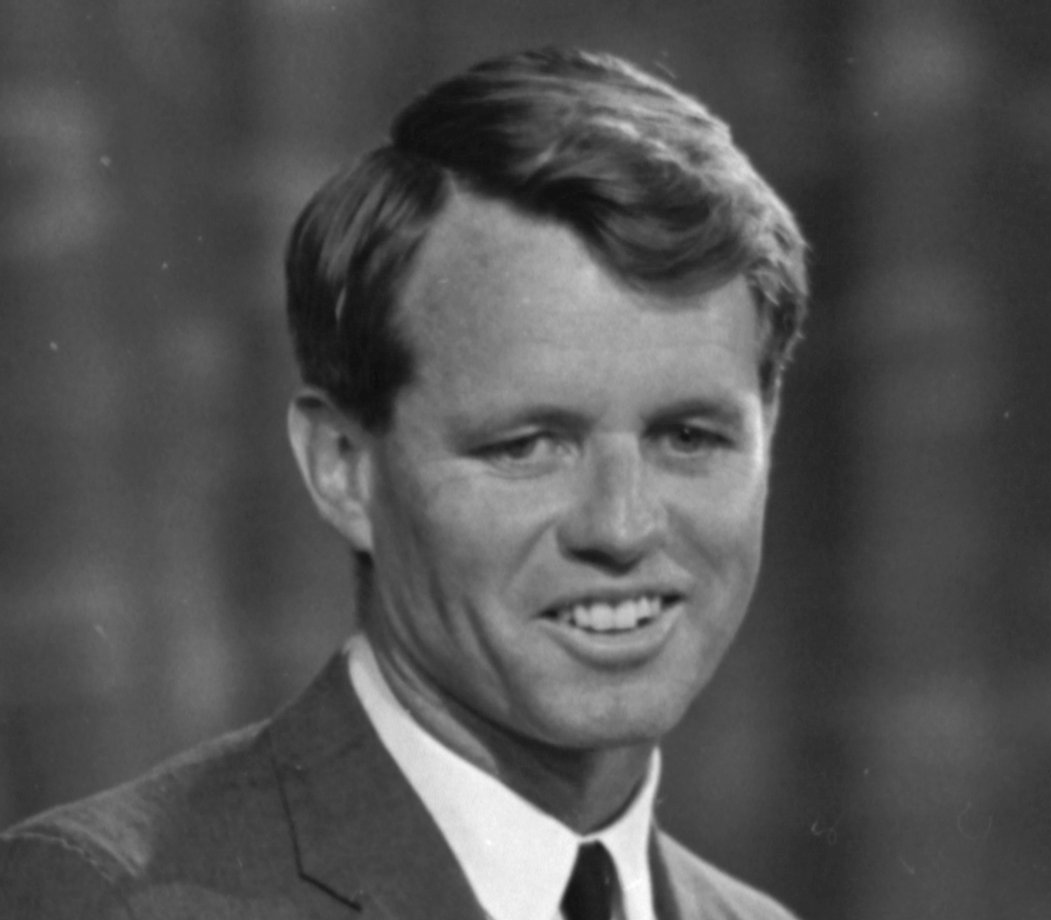
Robert F. Kennedy at the Platform Committee meetings ahead of the convention

With the office of Vice President vacant since the murder of President Kennedy nine months previous (the present solution of filling an intra-term vacancy as prescribed by the Twenty-fifth Amendment not being codified until 1967), the question of who would fill it was paramount on the minds of the *"chattering classes"*. It had been rumored that the President was going to choose his predecessor's brother-in-law Sargent Shriver but that Robert F. Kennedy had nixed this idea, claiming that he wasn't a real Kennedy and it would be impolitic to choose him. The Attorney General made it known that he deserved the second spot instead, but then President Johnson announced that sitting Cabinet members would not be under consideration. (A week after the convention, Kennedy resigned from the office of Attorney General to run for New York's Senate seat.)

Speculation centered on Senate Majority Whip Hubert H. Humphrey, a perennial candidate who had run for either the presidential or vice presidential nomination in every election since 1952, and was a champion of civil rights. On the second day of the convention, LBJ invited Humphrey and Connecticut Senator Thomas Dodd to the White House for an extended job interview. After a long wait, the President announced that his choice was Humphrey, who was nominated by voice vote the following day.

== Gallery ==
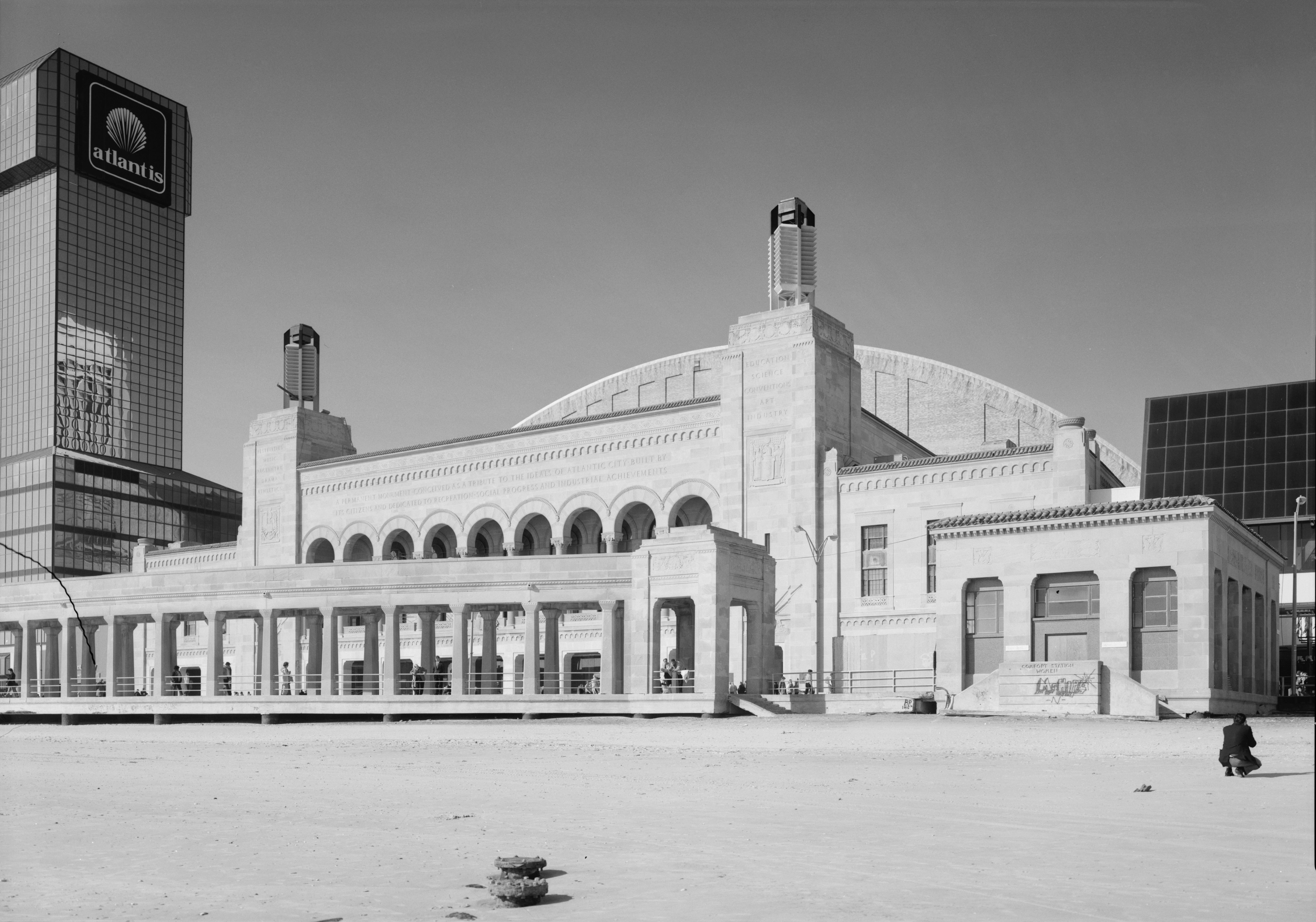
Boardwalk Hall (pictured here in 1992) was the site of the 1964 Democratic National Convention.

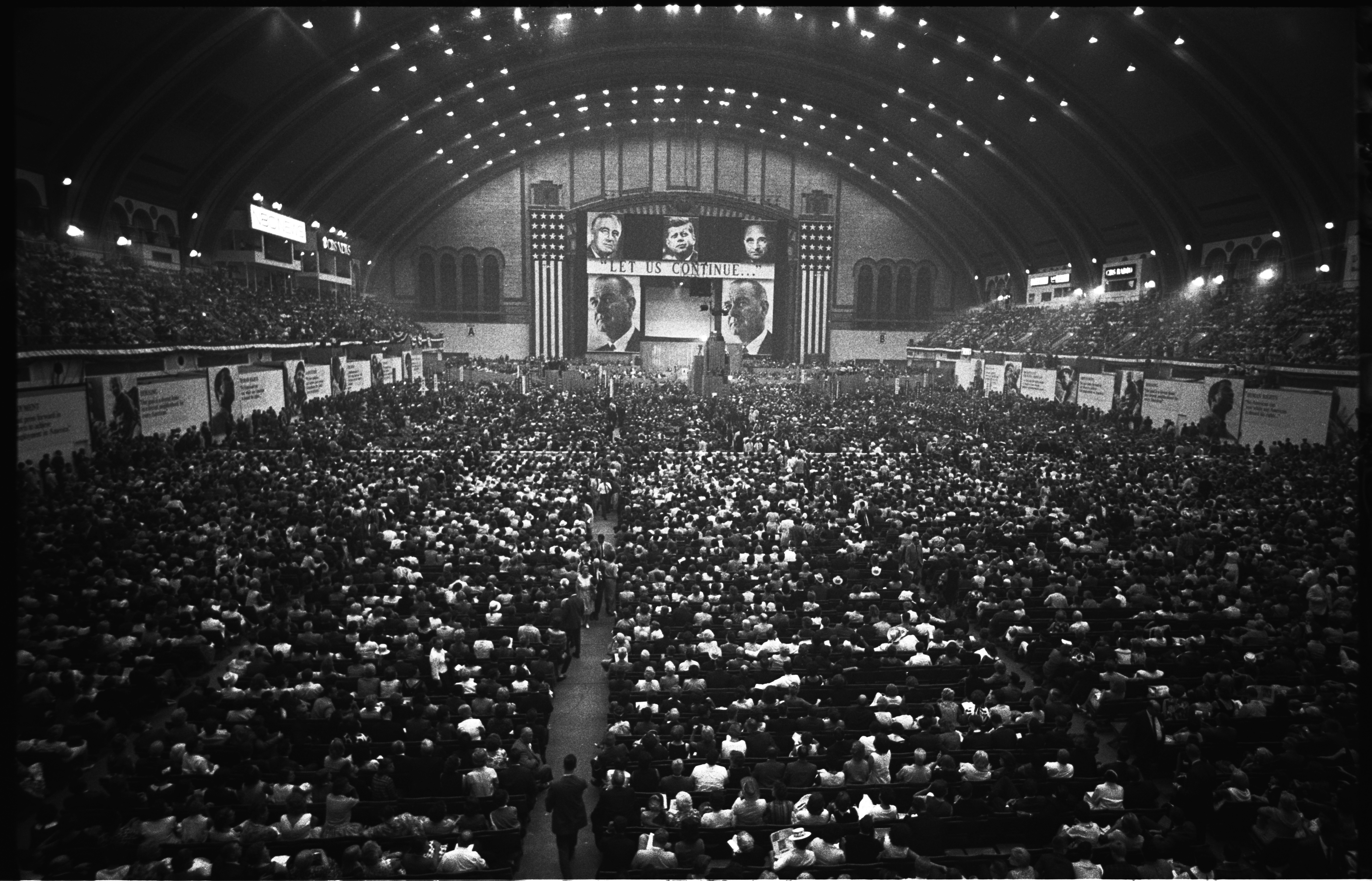
Convention floor, day 1

== See also ==
- 1964 Republican National Convention
- 1964 United States presidential election
- History of the United States Democratic Party
- List of Democratic National Conventions
- United States presidential nominating convention
- 1964 Democratic Party presidential primaries
- Southern strategy

Preceded by 1960; Los Angeles, California	Democratic National Conventions	Succeeded by 1968; Chicago, Illinois
