= 1964 Republican Party presidential primaries =

Selection of Republican US presidential candidate

- February 15 to June 19, 1964

1,308 delegates to the Republican National Convention 655 (majority) votes needed to win

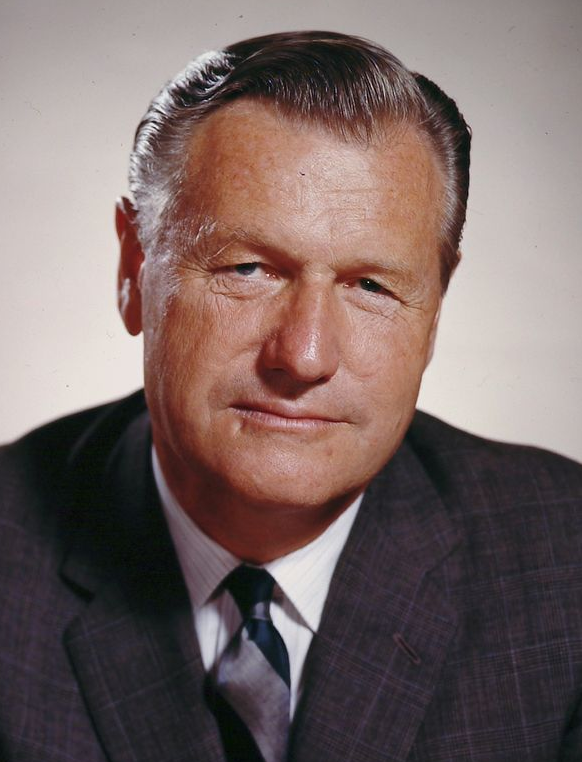

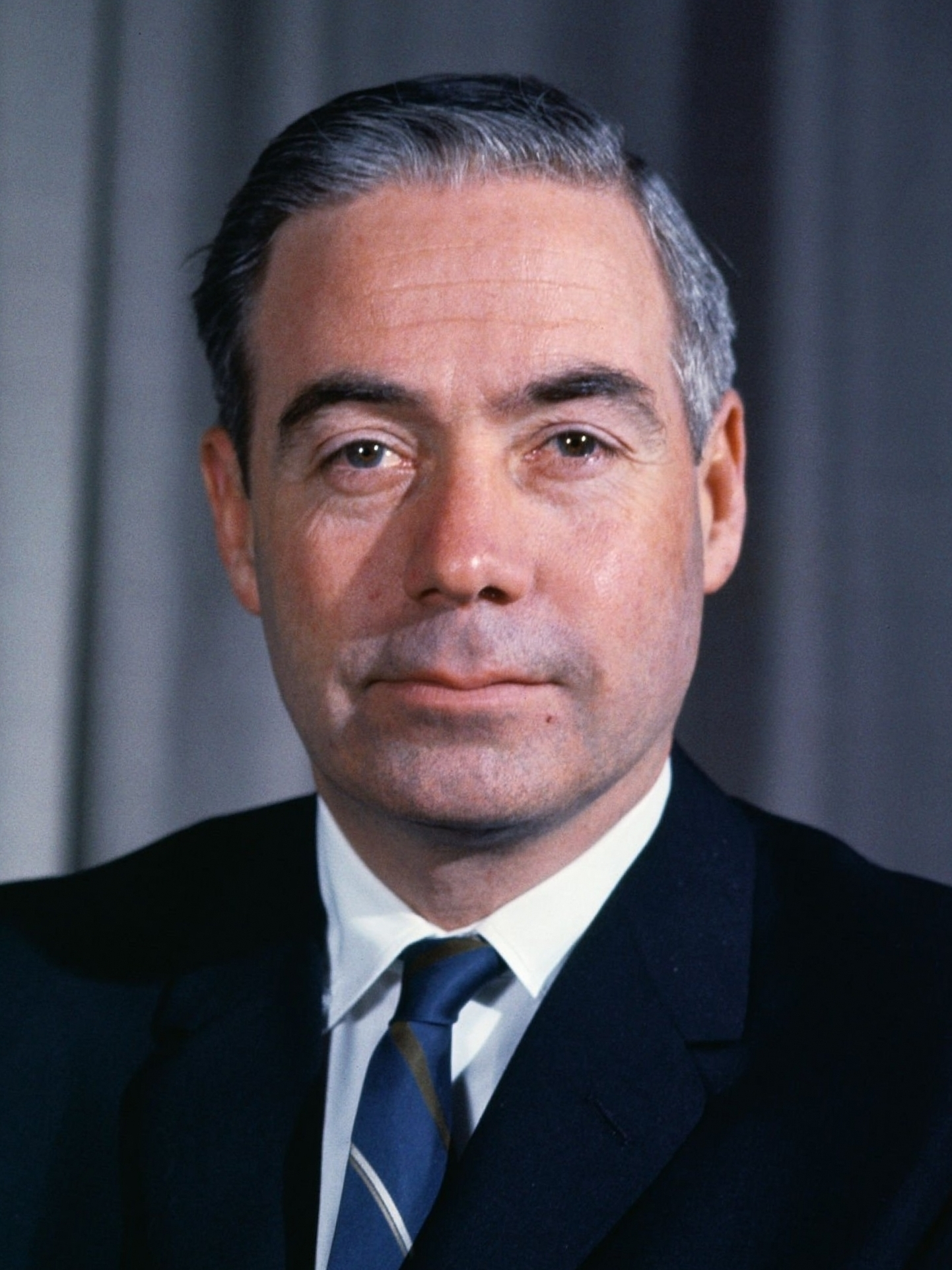

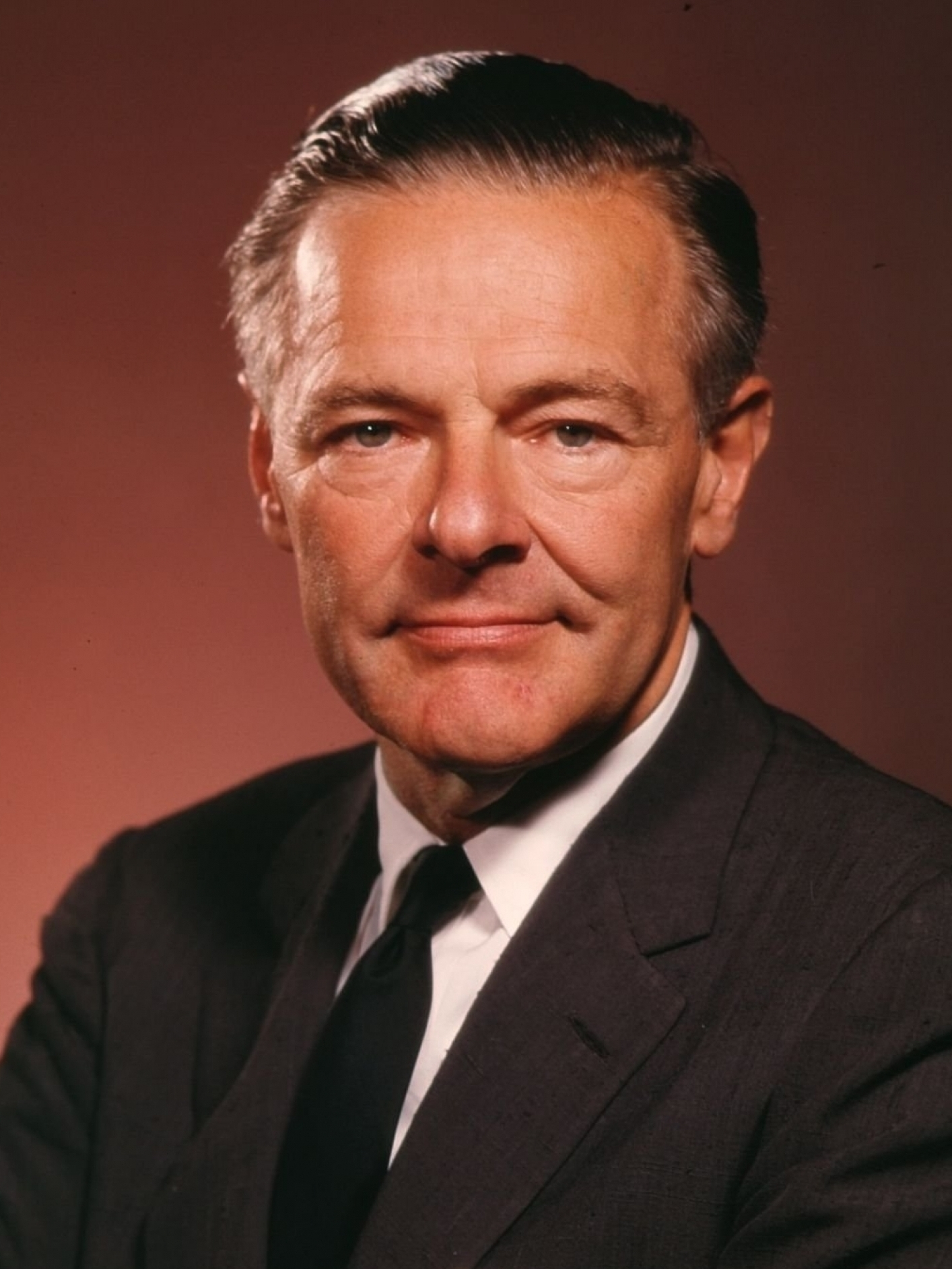

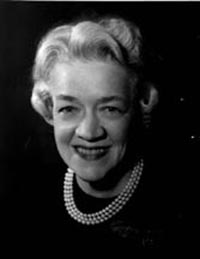
Candidate	Barry Goldwater	Nelson Rockefeller	William W. Scranton
Home state	Arizona	New York	Pennsylvania
Delegate count	560	119	52
Contests won	5	2	1
Popular vote	2,289,214	1,304,204	245,401
Percentage	38.6%	22.0%	4.1%
Candidate	Henry Cabot Lodge Jr.	Margaret Chase Smith
Home state	Massachusetts	Maine
Delegate count	43	14
Contests won	3	0
Popular vote	386,661	227,007
Percentage	6.5%	3.8%
- Goldwater Rockefeller Scranton; Lodge Chase Smith Various (Note: Favorite sons received the support of Michigan (George Romney), Minnesota (Walter Judd), Wisconsin (John Byrnes), Delaware (John Williams), Arkansas (Winthrop Rockefeller), Ohio (Jim Rhodes), and Hawaii (Hiram Fong).) Uncommitted
Previous Republican nominee
Richard Nixon
Republican nominee
Barry Goldwater

From February 15 to June 19, 1964, voters of the Republican Party elected 1,308 delegates to the 1964 Republican National Convention through a series of delegate selection primaries and caucuses, for the purpose of determining the party's nominee for president in the 1964 United States presidential election.

United States Senator Barry Goldwater of Arizona was selected as the nominee at the 1964 Republican National Convention held from July 13 to July 16, 1964, in San Francisco, California.

== Background ==
=== 1952 nomination ===
In 1952, Senator Robert A. Taft, a leading conservative, lost the nomination to Supreme Allied Commander Dwight D. Eisenhower. Eisenhower's candidacy was generated by a draft by the so-called "Eastern Establishment," led by Thomas E. Dewey and Henry Cabot Lodge Jr. The nomination was narrowly secured when Dewey and Lodge out-maneuvered Taft in pre-convention fights over delegate credentials. Eisenhower won the general election and was re-elected in 1956. The bitter 1952 convention, the presumption that Taft was too extreme to win the general election, and Eisenhower's re-election meant that conservative Republicans had not occupied the White House since at least 1929 or won the Republican nomination since at least 1936. The memory of 1952, the last contested Republican nomination, remained fresh in the minds of all parties as the 1964 primaries approached.

=== 1960 election ===
In 1960, the nomination was easily secured for Vice President Richard Nixon. Nixon, who had made his name as an anti-communist Representative and Senator from California, was acceptable to all branches of the party. His only serious challenge came from Nelson Rockefeller, the free-spending Governor of New York and heir to the Rockefeller family fortune and Dewey's position as leader of the moderate party establishment. Though Rockefeller could not take the nomination himself, he could potentially marshal delegates to deny Nixon the nomination at the convention. On July 22, Nixon met Rockefeller at the latter's Fifth Avenue penthouse. After four hours of negotiations, they reached an agreement for fourteen points in the party platform, generally committing Nixon to greater spending on defense and education, opposition to racial segregation, and a flexible internationalist foreign policy. The so-called Compact of Fifth Avenue was reviled by conservatives, who unsuccessfully attempted to draft Senator Barry Goldwater of Arizona, an occasional Eisenhower critic, as Nixon's running mate; at the convention, however, Goldwater declined to run.

Nixon narrowly lost the election to Senator John F. Kennedy of Massachusetts. Kennedy, the first Roman Catholic elected president and a supporter of federal enforcement of equal civil rights for African Americans, performed relatively poorly in the South. While the region had been a Democratic stronghold since the end of Reconstruction, Kennedy's only convincing majority was in the state of Georgia. He lost Tennessee and Florida to Nixon and only narrowly won North Carolina, South Carolina, and Texas. In four more states, Arkansas, Alabama, Mississippi, and Louisiana, dissident members of his own party fielded independent slates of electors which refused to pledge their votes to Kennedy. (Note: The electors in Alabama and Mississippi defeated Kennedy's slate. With the election decided for Kennedy, they safely cast their votes for Harry F. Byrd.) Thus, despite Nixon's loss, the Republican Party entered the Kennedy administration with hopes of finding support in the South.

=== Draft Goldwater Committee ===
The earliest movements toward the 1964 nomination were made on behalf of Senator Barry Goldwater of Arizona, against his express wishes, by a group composed mostly of Young Republicans and led by F. Clifton White, a longtime party activist from upstate New York. At a secret meeting in Chicago on October 8, 1961, White proposed that, partly thanks to the reallocation of delegates toward the conservative South and Midwest, a candidate could secure the nomination without the support of New York or New England. The group agreed to organize throughout the country and began fundraising.

In spring 1962, they leased a Manhattan office in the Chanin Building. Their address, Suite 3505, became the informal name of their campaign. Goldwater had a personal audience with White in January 1963 and urged him to drop the draft effort. Instead, the group went public as the "Draft Goldwater Committee." Headquarters were informally opened in critical states by mid-1963, and by the summer he led some opinion polls among Republicans. The New York Times reported on July 7 that a movement was underfoot in the northeast for "favorite sons" to run in state primaries to prevent a Goldwater nomination, since they feared major losses with Goldwater.

=== Nelson Rockefeller marriage ===
Though conservatives organized behind the unwilling Goldwater, the leading candidate for the nomination in early 1963 was Nelson Rockefeller. Rockefeller began to campaign around the country and was well received on a spring tour of the Midwest, though he stopped Goodwin Knight from formally establishing a California campaign office. He led most polling over Goldwater through the spring.

However, Rockefeller's popularity plummeted when he remarried on May 4. Rockefeller had been divorced from Mary Todhunter Clark for about one year. His new wife, Margaretta Large "Happy" Filter, was eighteen years his junior, had worked as a member of his office staff, and had been married to Rockefeller's close friend, with four children, just one month prior. They left for a honeymoon in Venezuela and the Virgin Islands.

The marriage was instantly the subject of scrutiny and criticism from the press, fellow Republicans, and even the United Presbyterian Church. (Note: The minister who performed the ceremony was censured by his presbytery for violating the Church's one-year waiting period for remarriage, and expressed his "deep regret.") Senator Prescott Bush of Connecticut, speaking at a prep school graduation, asked, "Have we come to the point in our life as a nation where the governor of a great state can desert a good wife, mother of his grown children, divorce her, then persuade a mother of youngsters to abandon her husband and their four children and marry the governor?" When the newlyweds attended the convention of the National Federation of Republican Women convention later that year (by then a loyal Goldwater organization), they were received with silence, and several women staged a walk-out. Others publicly criticizing the marriage included Reinhold Niebuhr and Nikita Khrushchev.

In Gallup polling, Rockefeller lost a seventeen-point lead in polling and trailed Goldwater by five points. Any conservative support was gone, as was much of his moderate base. The Republican Citizens Committee, a caucus of moderate Republicans, decided by July 16 not to support Rockefeller. Rockefeller plowed ahead with a New Hampshire campaign; on September 16, he announced that former Governor Hugh Gregg would lead his campaign. Rockefeller began campaigning in New Hampshire in October 1963 and formally entered the race on November 7.

=== Kennedy assassination ===
On November 22, 1963, President John F. Kennedy was assassinated in Dallas.

The Kennedy assassination rocked the Republican primary. Rockefeller, the only candidate actively in the race, paused his campaign for a month of mourning. Those candidates not already running declined to openly seek the nomination, either out of principle or fear of a career-ending loss. Newly inaugurated President Lyndon B. Johnson enjoyed a major groundswell of sympathy and support, leading all contenders by a large margin.

On December 7, Dwight Eisenhower called on Henry Cabot Lodge Jr. to enter the race as a compromise candidate.

Goldwater formally entered the race on January 3.

== Schedule and results ==
Date (daily totals)	Contest	Total pledged delegates										
Date (daily totals)	Contest	Total pledged delegates	Delegates won and popular vote (Note: This should not be taken as a finalized list of results. While a significant amount of research was done, there were a number of delegates who were not bound by the instruction, or "pledged" to a candidate, though an attempt has been made to display their initial preferences. Some states also held primaries for the delegate positions, and these on occasion were where slates or candidates pledge to a certain candidate might be elected; however, as these elections allowed for a single person to vote for multiple candidates, as many as the number of positions being filled, it is difficult to determine how many people actually voted in these primaries. For this reason, while the results of some are in the table, they are not included in the popular vote summaries at the bottom of the table.)									
Date (daily totals)	Contest	Total pledged delegates	Barry Goldwater	Nelson Rockefeller	Henry C. Lodge	William Scranton	Richard Nixon	Margaret C. Smith	Favorite Sons	Harold Stassen	Others	Uncommitted
February 15	North Carolina (Note: North Carolina's 2nd, 6th and 9th congressional districts.) district conventions	6 (of 26)	4	—	—	—	—	—	—	—	—	2
February 19	North Carolina's 7th district convention	2 (of 26)	2	—	—	—	—	—	—	—	—	—
February 22	North Carolina (Note: North Carolina's 1st, 3rd, 4th, 5th, 8th, 10th, and 11th congressional districts.) district conventions	16 (of 26)	8	—	—	—	—	—	—	—	—	8 (Note: Two in this group from the 3rd might have been pledged to Goldwater; they weren't polled, but reportedly the District Convention in the 3rd was strongly in favor of Goldwater.)
February 29	North Carolina convention	4 (of 26)	—	—	—	—	—	—	—	—	—	4 (Note: While not Committed, they were in favor of Barry Goldwater.)
February 29	Oklahoma convention	22	22	—	—	—	—	—	—	—	—	—
March 7	Kansas's 4th district convention	3 (of 20)	2	—	—	—	—	—	—	—	—	1
March 10	New Hampshire 92,853	14	20,692 (22.29%)	19,504 (21.01%)	14; 33,007 (35.55%)	105 (0.11%)	15,587 (16.79%)	2,120 (2.28%)	—	1,373 (1.48%)	465 (0.50%)	—
March 14	Kansas's 1st district convention	3 (of 20)	—	—	—	—	—	—	—	—	—	3
March 21	Georgia district conventions	20 (of 24)	18	—	—	—	—	—	—	—	—	2
March 21	Kansas's 3rd district convention	3 (of 20)	—	—	—	—	—	—	—	—	—	3
March 21	South Carolina convention	16	16	—	—	—	—	—	—	—	—	—
March 21	Tennessee's 5th district convention	2 (of 28)	2	—	—	—	—	—	—	—	—	—
March 28	Kansas's 5th district convention	3 (of 20)	—	—	—	—	—	—	—	—	—	3
April 4	Kansas's 2nd district convention	3 (of 20)	—	—	—	—	—	—	—	—	—	3
April 4	Louisiana's 4th district convention	2 (of 20)	2	—	—	—	—	—	—	—	—	—
April 6	Louisiana (Note: Louisiana's 5th, 7th, and 8th congressional districts.) district conventions	6 (of 20)	6	—	—	—	—	—	—	—	—	—
April 7	Louisiana (Note: Louisiana's 1st, 2nd, 3rd, and 6th congressional districts) district conventions	8 (of 20)	8	—	—	—	—	—	—	—	—	—
April 7	Minnesota's 5th district convention	2 (of 26)	—	—	—	—	—	—	2 (Note: Committed to Congressman Walter Judd of Minnesota.)	—	—	—
April 7	Wisconsin 300,428	30	—	—	—	—	—	—	30 (Note: Committed to Congressman John Byrnes of Wisconsin.); 299,612 (99.73%)	—	—	816 (Note: Peter Reiss ran as an uncommitted delegate in the 6th Congressional District; otherwise, there was no opposition.) (0.27%)
April 8	North Dakota convention	14	4	—	—	—	—	—	—	—	—	10
April 11	Kentucky convention	24	—	—	—	—	—	—	0 (Note: An attempt was made to nominate Senator Thruston Morton as a favorite-son candidate, but Morton declined.)	—	—	24
April 11	Minnesota (Note: Minnesota's 1st, 4th, and 6th congressional districts) district conventions	6 (of 26)	2	—	—	—	—	—	2 (Note: Committed to Congressman Walter Judd of Minnesota.)	—	—	2
April 11	Tennessee's 9th district convention	2 (of 28)	—	—	—	—	—	—	—	—	—	2
April 11	Virginia (Note: Virginia's 7th and 9th congressional districts) district conventions	4 (of 30)	—	—	—	—	—	—	—	—	—	4
April 14	Illinois (Note: There were two primaries in this state: a non-binding preference primary in which eligible voters cast ballots directly for a candidate and a delegate primary in which delegates to the National Convention were elected.) 827,791	48 (of 58)	30; 512,840 (61.95%)	1; 2,048 (0.25%)	68,122 (8.23%)	1,842 (0.22%)	2; 30,313 (3.66%)	209,521 (25.31%)	—	—	3,105 (Note: Includes 2,203 write-in votes for George Wallace, and 465 write-in votes for George Romney.) (0.38%)	15 (Note: Includes five delegates whose preferences were not known.)
April 17	Minnesota's 3rd district convention	2 (of 26)	—	—	—	—	—	—	—	—	—	2
April 18	Arizona convention	16	16	—	—	—	—	—	—	—	—	—
April 18	Kansas convention	5 (of 20)	—	—	—	—	—	—	—	—	—	5
April 18	Louisiana convention	4 (of 20)	4	—	—	—	—	—	—	—	—	—
April 18	Minnesota (Note: Minnesota's 2nd and 7th congressional districts) district conventions	4 (of 26)	2	—	—	—	—	—	—	—	—	2
April 18	Tennessee (Note: Tennessee's 1st and 6th congressional districts) district conventions	4 (of 28)	—	—	—	—	—	—	—	—	—	4
April 21	New Jersey 18,933	40	5,309 (28.04%)	612 (3.23%)	7,896 (41.71%)	633 (3.34%)	4,179 (22.07%)	—	—	—	304 (Note: Includes 220 write-in votes for George Wallace, and 84 write-in votes for Lyndon Johnson.) (1.61%)	40 –
April 22	Iowa convention	24	5	—	—	—	—	—	—	—	—	19
April 22	Tennessee's 7th district convention	2 (of 28)	—	—	—	—	—	—	—	—	—	2
April 24	Alaska convention	12	—	—	—	—	—	—	—	—	—	12 (Note: At the time of their election, 6 Delegates were essentially committed to Rockefeller, with another committed to Lodge.)
April 25	Minnesota's 8th district convention	2 (of 26)	2	—	—	—	—	—	—	—	—	—
April 25	Nevada convention	6	6	—	—	—	—	—	—	—	—	—
April 25	Virginia's 1st district convention	2 (of 30)	—	—	—	—	—	—	—	—	—	2
April 28	Massachusetts 92,134	34	5; 9,338 (10.14%)	2,454 (2.66%)	29; 70,809 (76.85%)	1,709 (1.86%)	5,460 (5.93%)	426 (0.40%)	—	—	1,938 (Note: Includes 600 write-in votes (0.65%) for Lyndon Johnson, 365 write-in votes (0.40%) for George Cabot Lodge, and 262 write-in votes (0.28%) for George Romney.)(2.10%)	—
April 28	Missouri's 5th district convention	2 (of 24)	1	—	—	—	—	—	—	—	—	1
April 28	Pennsylvania 452,868	54 (of 64)	2; 38,669 (8.54%)	9,123 (2.01%)	92,712 (20.47%)	52; 235,222 (51.94%)	44,396 (9.80%)	—	—	—	32,746 (Note: Includes 22,372 write-in votes for Lyndon Johnson and 5,105 write-in votes for George Wallace.) (7.23%)	—
April 28	Tennessee's 2nd district convention	2 (of 28)	—	—	—	—	—	—	—	—	—	2
April 30	Tennessee (Note: Tennessee's 3rd, 4th, and 8th congressional districts. This is an assumption; a source from infers that the three districts listed had not yet had their conventions by April 29, yet another source infers that by May 1 the selections had been completed in all the districts. However, it is known that these delegates were uncommitted, as only four committed delegates were elected in Tennessee, and those are accounted for.) district conventions	6 (of 28)	—	—	—	—	—	—	—	—	—	6
May 2	Georgia convention	4 (of 24)	4	—	—	—	—	—	—	—	—	—
May 2	Maine convention	14	—	—	—	—	—	14	—	—	—	—
May 2	Missouri's 4th district convention	2 (of 24)	2	—	—	—	—	—	—	—	—	—
May 2	Tennessee convention	10 (of 28)	—	—	—	—	—	—	—	—	—	10 (Note: While a resolution endorsing Goldwater was adopted at the convention, the delegates remained Uncommitted.)
May 2	Texas 139,323	0 (of 56)	104,137 (74.75%)	6,207 (4.46%)	12,324 (8.85%)	803 (0.58%)	5,390 (3.87%)	4,816 (3.46%)	—	5,273 (3.79%)	373 (0.27%)	—
May 4	Missouri's 10th district convention	2 (of 24)	—	—	—	—	—	—	—	—	—	2
May 5	Delaware convention	12	—	—	—	—	—	—	12 (Note: Initially Uncommitted; later Committed to Senator John Williams of Delaware.)	—	—	—
May 5	Indiana 399,680	32	32; 267,935 (67.04%)	—	—	—	—	—	—	107,157 (26.81%)	24,588 (6.15%)	—
May 5	Ohio 615,754	58	—	—	—	—	—	—	58 (Note: All votes and delegates for Governor James Rhodes of Ohio.); 615,754 (100.00%)	—	—	—
May 5	Washington, D.C.	9	2	4	—	—	—	—	—	—	—	3
May 9	Michigan convention	48	—	—	—	—	—	—	48 (Note: Committed to Governor George Romney of Michigan.)	—	—	—
May 9	Missouri (Note: Missouri's 2nd, 7th, and 9th congressional districts) district conventions	6 (of 24)	5	—	—	—	—	—	—	—	—	1
May 9	Virginia (Note: Virginia's 2nd, 3rd and 8th congressional districts) district conventions	6 (of 30)	6	—	—	—	—	—	—	—	—	—
May 9	Wyoming convention	14	14	—	—	—	—	—	—	—	—	—
May 11	Missouri's 6th district convention	2 (of 24)	—	—	—	—	—	—	—	—	—	2
May 12	Nebraska 138,522	6 (of 16)	5; 68,050 (49.1%)	2,333 (1.7%)	22,622 (16.3%)	578 (0.4%)	43,613 (31.5%)	243 (0.2%)	—	—	373 (Note: Includes 316 write-in votes for Lyndon Johnson, 293 write-in votes for George Wallace, and 132 write-in votes for George Romney.) (0.8%)	1 –
May 12	Missouri (Note: Missouri's 1st, 3rd and 8th congressional districts) district conventions	6 (of 24)	4	—	—	—	—	—	—	—	—	2
May 12	Rhode Island convention	14	—	—	—	—	—	—	—	—	—	14
May 12	West Virginia 115,680	14	3 –	2; 115,680 (100.00%)	—	—	—	—	—	—	—	9 –
May 15	Oregon 286,919	18	50,105(17.46%)	18; 94,190 (32.83%)	79,169 (27.59%)	4,509 (1.57%)	48,274 (16.83%)	8,087 (2.82%)	—	—	2,585 (Note: Includes 2,448 write-in votes for Robert Kennedy and 137 write-in votes for Hubert Humphrey.) (0.90%)	—
May 16	Vermont convention	12	3	—	—	—	—	—	—	—	—	9
May 19	Maryland 97,998	20	4; 22,135 (Note: Technically, the votes were for John Steffey, who represented Barry Goldwater in the primary.) (22.59%)	—	—	—	—	—	—	—	18,859 (Note: All votes were for Robert E. Ennis.) (19.24%)	16; 57,004 (58.17%)
May 21	Arkansas convention	12	—	—	—	—	—	—	12 (Note: Instructed, though not Committed, to Winthrop Rockefeller of Arkansas.)	—	—	—
May 21	Virginia's 10th district convention	2 (of 30)	2	—	—	—	—	—	—	—	—	—
May 23	Colorado's 1st district convention	2 (of 18)	—	—	—	—	—	—	—	—	—	2
May 23	Illinois convention	10 (of 58)	6	—	—	—	—	—	—	—	—	4
May 26	Florida 100,704	20	42,525 (42.23%)	—	—	—	—	—	—	—	—	34 (Note: While uncommitted, the vast majority of the delegates elected were supportive of Goldwater's candidacy.); 58,179 (57.77%)
May 30	Mississippi convention	13	13	—	—	—	—	—	—	—	—	—
June 1	Nebraska convention	10 (of 16)	10	—	—	—	—	—	—	—	—	—
June 2	California 2,172,456	86	86; 1,120,403 (51.57%)	1,052,053 (48.43%)	—	—	—	—	—	—	—	—
June 2	New York	92	2	86 (Note: 10 Delegates were appointed earlier by the Republican State Committee.)	—	—	—	—	—	—	—	4
June 2	South Dakota 84,729	14	27,076 (31.96%)	—	—	—	—	—	—	—	—	14 (Note: While uncommitted, at least six were leaning towards Goldwater; two more leaned towards Nixon.); 57,653 (68.04%)
June 4	Virgin Islands convention	3	—	3	—	—	—	—	—	—	—	—
June 5	Colorado (Note: Colorado's 2nd, 3rd, and 4th congressional districts) district conventions	6 (of 18)	4	—	—	—	—	—	—	—	—	2
June 5	Washington convention	24	21	—	—	—	—	—	—	—	—	3
June 6	Alabama convention	20	20	—	—	—	—	—	—	—	—	—
June 6	Colorado convention	10 (of 18)	10	—	—	—	—	—	—	—	—	—
June 6	Hawaii convention	8	—	—	—	—	—	—	—	—	—	8 (Note: Technically there was a split, 4–4, between those who supported Goldwater and Moderates.)
June 6	Virginia (Note: Virginia's 4th and 6th congressional districts) district conventions	4 (of 30)	4	—	—	—	—	—	—	—	—	—
June 7	Puerto Rico convention	5	—	5	—	—	—	—	—	—	—	—
June 12	Missouri convention	4 (of 24)	4	—	—	—	—	—	—	—	—	—
June 12	Virginia's 5th district convention	2 (of 30)	2	—	—	—	—	—	—	—	—	—
June 13	Connecticut convention	16	4	—	—	—	—	—	—	—	—	12 (Note: There was an expectation that these delegates would be won over by Scranton, but at the time they were still Uncommitted.)
June 13	Idaho convention	14	14	—	—	—	—	—	—	—	—	—
June 13	Minnesota convention	10 (of 26)	—	—	—	—	—	—	—	—	—	10
June 13	New Mexico convention	14	14	—	—	—	—	—	—	—	—	—
June 13	Utah convention	14	11	—	—	—	—	—	—	—	—	3
June 13	Virginia convention	10 (of 30)	10	—	—	—	—	—	—	—	—	—
June 16	Texas convention	56	56	—	—	—	—	—	—	—	—	—
June 19	Montana convention	14	14	—	—	—	—	—	—	—	—	—
1,308 delegates 5,936,062 votes			560 2,289,214 (38.57%)	119 1,304,204 (21.97%)	43 386,661 (6.51%)	52 245,401 (4.13%)	2 197,212 (3.32%)	14 225,213 (3.79%)	164 915,366 (15.42%)	0 113,803 (1.92%)	0 85,336 (1.44%)	348 173,652 (2.93%)
Suspected delegate count July 13, 1964			772 (59.02%)	106 (8.10%)	—'	165 (12.61%)	—'	20 (1.53%)	105 (8.03%)	—'	—'	95 (7.26%)

== Candidates ==
The following political leaders were candidates for the 1964 Republican presidential nomination:

=== Nominee ===
Candidate	Most recent office	Home state	Campaign Withdrawal date	Popular vote	Contests won	Running mate
Barry Goldwater	U.S. Senator from Arizona (1953–1965, 1969–1987)	Arizona	(Campaign); Secured nomination: July 16, 1964	2,267,079 (38.3%)	7	William E. Miller

=== Other major candidates ===
These candidates participated in multiple state primaries or were included in multiple major national polls.

Candidate	Most recent office	Home state	Campaign Withdrawal date
William Scranton	Governor of Pennsylvania (1963–1967)	Pennsylvania	(Campaign); Withdrew: April 10, 1964; Re-entered race: June 12, 1964; Withdrew at convention: July 16, 1964
Margaret Chase Smith	U.S. Senator from Maine (1949–1973)	Maine	(Campaign); Announced campaign: January 27, 1964; Withdrew at convention: July 16, 1964
Nelson Rockefeller	Governor of New York (1959–1973)	New York	(Campaign); Announced campaign: November 7, 1963; Withdrew: June 14, 1964 (endorsed Scranton)
Henry Cabot Lodge Jr.	Ambassador of the United States to South Vietnam (1963–1964)	Massachusetts	(Campaign); Renounced draft: January 4, 1964; Withdrew before convention (endorsed Rockefeller, then Scranton)
Harold Stassen	Governor of Minnesota (1939–1943)	Minnesota	(Campaign); Announced campaign: January 20, 1964

=== Favorite sons ===
The following candidates ran only in their state's own primary, for the purpose of controlling the delegate slate at the 1964 Convention:

- Representative John W. Byrnes of Wisconsin
- Senator Hiram Fong of Hawaii
- Governor Jim Rhodes of Ohio

=== Declined to run ===
- Former Military Governor of the U.S. Occupation Zone in Germany Lucius D. Clay of New York
- Governor Mark Hatfield of Oregon
- Aviator Charles Lindbergh of Connecticut
- Former Vice President Richard Nixon of California
- Governor George Romney of Michigan
- General Edwin Walker of Texas

== Polling ==
=== National polling ===
Graph of opinion polls conducted View source data.

Poll source	Publication	Barry Goldwater	Henry Cabot Lodge Jr.	Richard Nixon	Nelson Rockefeller	William Scranton II
Gallup	Feb. 1962	13%	–	46%	17%	–
Gallup	Apr. 1962	23%	–	–	33%	–
Gallup	May 1962	23%	–	42%	32%	–
Gallup	June 1962	21%	–	45%	31%	–
Gallup	Nov. 1962	11%	–	21%	41%	3%
Gallup	Dec. 1962	26%	1%	1%	46%	5%
Gallup	Feb. 1963	17%	–	–	49%	8%
Gallup	Mar. 1963	21%	–	–	44%	9%
Gallup	Apr. 1963	26%	–	–	43%	7%
Gallup	May 1963	35%	–	–	30%	–
Gallup	May 1963	38%	–	–	28%	–
Gallup	June 1963	39%	–	–	27%	–
Gallup	July 1963	39%	–	–	22%	4%
Gallup	Aug. 1963	38%	–	–	29%	4%
Gallup	Sep. 1963	42%	–	–	26%	4%
Gallup	Oct. 1963	45%	–	–	23%	5%
Gallup	Nov. 1963	23%	19%	29%	12%	4%
Gallup	Dec. 1963	27%	16%	29%	13%	2%
Gallup	Feb. 1964	20%	12%	31%	16%	7%
Gallup	Mar. 1964	14%	42%	26%	6%	4%
Gallup	Apr. 1964	14%	37%	28%	9%	4%
Gallup	Apr. 1964	15%	36%	27%	7%	5%
Gallup	June 1964	21%	26%	25%	10%	9%
Gallup	June 1964	22%	21%	22%	6%	20%

== Campaign ==
=== March 10: New Hampshire primary and Draft Lodge movement ===
The first test for the candidates came in New Hampshire, where any candidate's name could be submitted to the ballot without their affirmative consent.

With the support of the influential Manchester Union-Leader and Senator Norris Cotton, the Goldwater campaign was confident they would carry New Hampshire. However, after a disastrous, gaffe-filled appearance on Meet the Press and a trip to the state in January, in which he countered President Johnson's claim that Kennedy was "a victim of hate" and challenged the Pentagon to disclose the details of its long-range missile program, his momentum stalled. In total, Goldwater would spend twenty-one days campaign continuously in New Hampshire before leaving on March 7, confidently predicting, "I've got it made."

Many sought an alternative to Goldwater and Rockefeller. Despite lobbying from liberal Republicans, William Scranton and George Romney both legally moved to remove themselves from consideration. Senator Margaret Chase Smith of neighboring Maine, the first woman to campaign for a major party nomination, visited only briefly, did not purchase television advertisements, and gained little traction in the state. Another obvious option, Richard Nixon, held himself out as an elder statesman and potential candidate for a draft, but few steps were made on his behalf.

Instead, moderates and liberals rallied behind Eisenhower's choice for the nomination, Henry Cabot Lodge Jr. Lodge was serving as United States Ambassador to South Vietnam, and through his son George C. Lodge had communicated a policy of non-interference with his campaign managers in New Hampshire. Building off momentum from Eisenhower's rumored endorsement and working with the Robert Mullen Company, the leanly staffed Draft Lodge movement operated through an effective use of the press and advertising. The Draft Lodge men ran a commercial from the 1960 campaign, edited to imply that Eisenhower had publicly endorsed Lodge. When Goldwater pled with the former president to refute the ad, Eisenhower declined.

Draft Lodge gained new momentum in February when Goldwater declared that Lodge had "kind of balled up" Vietnam. Although the Lodge campaign expected that this would open the door for Rockefeller to seize momentum by defending Lodge's name, Rockefeller instead joined the attack with a statement on the "mess" in Vietnam before quickly reversing and publicly apologizing to Lodge. Thus, Lodge remained above the fray and a symbol of patriotic diplomacy, while Goldwater appeared unpatriotic and Rockefeller appeared to be both a bully and a wimp. As the primary approached and Lodge appeared to be a viable candidate, his son and Robert Mullen personally visited the state.

The primary itself was held under a foot of snow. Lodge delegates swept, and he received 35 percent of the vote. He was followed by Goldwater with 23 percent, Rockefeller with 21 percent, Nixon with 17 percent, and Margaret Chase Smith with 3 percent. A handful of voters wrote in Bill Scranton, despite his refusal to stand as a candidate.

Despite the victory, Lodge announced, "I do not plan to go to the United States. I do not plan to leave Saigon. I do not intend to resign." Regardless, the primary was a major victory for liberals and moderates over the conservative Goldwater campaign. Scotty Reston predicted Scranton, Nixon, or Lodge would be nominated, and Nixon told reporters, "I feel that there is no man in this country who can make a case against Mr. Johnson more effectively than I can" before departing for a tour of Asia. Goldwater admitted that he had "goofed up somewhere," but his campaign remained optimistic; Denison Kitchel said he was pleased that "a candidate from the Far West... could do so well in the New England state of New Hampshire,"

=== Northeast primaries ===
In the four-week lull after New Hampshire, Goldwater and Rockefeller both worked on trying to win endorsements in various states. Both worked on a Republican volunteer organization in California, where the two were scheduled to appear on the ballot in the primary on June 2. The Field Research Associates released a poll showing Lodge in the lead in the state with 31% to 25% for Goldwater, 21% for Nixon, and just 12% for Rockefeller. Upon hearing the poll results, Goldwater said that Lodge would not do what was needed to win the nomination, and if chosen he would not work hard enough to win the election. Soon thereafter, both Gallup and Harris released polls showing Lodge as the front-runner with Nixon second and Goldwater a poor third. Scranton stated on April 10 that he was not a candidate, thus reducing the field.

==== Illinois ====
Illinois held its primary on April 14. With the state Republican leadership almost solidly behind Goldwater, only Margaret C. Smith chose to file for the primary against Goldwater. During the campaign, Nixon and Lodge asked followers not to mount a campaign there. Goldwater defeated Smith 62-25%, which was far and away Smith's best primary performance. Lodge placed third on write-ins and Nixon fourth. The delegate count: Goldwater 159, Rockefeller 90, Lodge 14.

==== New Jersey ====
New Jersey voted on April 21. No candidates filed, so all votes were write-ins. Lodge again placed first with 42% to Goldwater 28%, Nixon 22%, and only 8% for all others. Massachusetts and Pennsylvania voted on April 28. No candidate appeared on the ballot in either. On the day before the two primaries, Rockefeller took the controversial stand of calling for US air strikes into Laos and Cambodia to help the government of South Vietnam. Lodge won Massachusetts with 77% of the vote to 10% for Goldwater and only 6% for Nixon. Scranton won his home state with 52% to Lodge 21%, Nixon 10%, and Goldwater 9%. It was clear that the Republican voters were not lining up behind either Goldwater or Rockefeller, who at this point had won together just 35% of the primary vote. In fact, if Illinois is taken out of the numbers, Lodge had received three write-in votes for every Goldwater vote at this stage of the campaign, with Nixon's write-ins very close behind Goldwater.

=== Texas to Florida ===
Another large chunk of delegates was chosen in the month following the Pennsylvania primary. During this time, eight states held primaries. Rockefeller recognized that the stakes were higher than ever; he was only mounting a serious campaign in two. He attacked Goldwater as irresponsible and extreme, a candidate who would ruin the Republican Party. Rockefeller also publicly chastised the supporters of Lodge. Since moderate Republicans were dividing their primary votes among Rockefeller, Lodge, and Scranton, they were allowing Goldwater to win many delegates he otherwise would not win. Campaigning in West Virginia, Rockefeller said that Lodge was "a person who isn't there, who says nothing on any issues".

Goldwater spent the early part of the month in the South. He won 75% of the vote in the first Republican presidential primary in Texas. That same day, his supporters pushed the small cadre of black voters out of the Georgia Republican Party, taking 22 out of the 24 national delegates. Goldwater supporters the following day forced through Tennessee's first all-white delegation to the Republican National Convention in half a century. With these delegate appointments, the AP estimated that Goldwater had 209 delegates; uncommitted was second with 143 to Scranton 63, Lodge 43, and 55 for others. Rockefeller had not won a single delegate at the time. Four states held mostly uncontested primaries in the following two weeks; Goldwater won Indiana and Nebraska, Rockefeller won West Virginia, and Governor Rhodes won his home state of Ohio.

The Oregon primary was held on May 15. As one of the most important primaries of the year, all candidates spent time trying to win the state. Lodge took the lead in Oregon opinion polls soon after the New Hampshire primary, but Rockefeller pressed on Lodge's supporters to abandon him for not taking a stand against Goldwater. The primary was widely seen as a precursor to the California primary, which Goldwater needed to win in order to have a majority of convention delegates. Two days before Oregon voted, a California poll showed Goldwater leading Rockefeller there by 43-27%. The poll precipitated a critical Rockefeller win in the Oregon primary. Rockefeller placed first with 33%, followed by Lodge with 28%, Goldwater with 18%, and Nixon with 17%.

In the latter half of the month, Goldwater continued to move towards the nomination. The only contested primary was in Florida, where a slate of uncommitted delegates unexpectedly defeated a Goldwater slate. However, AP estimated on May 24 that Goldwater led with 304 delegates. Scranton was second with 70, followed by Rhodes with 58. Lodge had 44, and Rockefeller had 39; the uncommitted total was 224. The estimate was published the same day that Goldwater supporters were easily defeated in Alaska.

=== California and South Dakota ===
Senator Goldwater's overall strategy was to lock up the delegate votes from the South and the West. If he could win California, he would be able to win the presidential nomination on the first ballot. His support in California public opinion polls remained a steady 43% throughout the spring, not deterred by his under-performance in primary after primary. Even when Lodge's supporters agreed to join Rockefeller in California in a "stop Goldwater" move, the polls only showed a minimal gain for Rocky. With both candidates campaigning full-time, both drawing large crowds of interested Republicans, the division in the party was quite apparent. Another thing became clear: the California voters finally began shifting to Rocky, who took the lead in opinion polls in the week preceding the primary. As often happens in politics, a mostly unrelated event took place that changed everything. On May 30, Margaretta Rockefeller had a baby son. Newspaper coverage included the information that Margaretta had worked on Rockefeller's staff before the two of them divorced their long-time spouses to marry each other. This was not new information, but it had been mostly forgotten by the voters.

Just over two million people voted in California's Republican primary, approximately one third of all nationwide votes in the Republican primaries of 1964. CBS used computers to sample the data collected from various polling places to announce at 7:22 p.m. Pacific time that Goldwater would win the race. Other news organizations were slower to make that prediction, and at one point Rockefeller took the lead temporarily. In the end, Goldwater won the California primary by 3%. Goldwater addressed supporters as the networks showed him in the lead; he said "This is a victory not for Barry Goldwater, but for the mainstream of Republican thinking". By gaining the 86 delegates from California, he was just 30 delegates short of a majority. South Dakota chose 14 delegates on the same day as California, but an uncommitted slate easily defeated a Goldwater slate by a 2:1 margin.

=== Endorsements ===
List of Nelson Rockefeller endorsements

Senators

- John Sherman Cooper (R-KY)
- Jacob Javits (R-NY)
- Kenneth Keating (R-NY)
- Thomas Kuchel (R-CA)
- Henry Cabot Lodge Jr. (R-MA)

Representatives

- Mark Andrews (R-ND)
- Paul Findley (R-IL)
- Paul Fino (R-NY)
- Seymour Halpern (R-NY)
- Frank Horton (R-NY)
- John Lindsay (R-NY)
- Ogden Reid (R-NY)
- Stanley Tupper (R-ME)
List of William Scranton endorsements

Senators

- Clifford Case (R-NJ)
- James Pearson (R-KS)
- Hugh Scott (R-PA)

Representatives

- James G. Fulton (R-PA)
- Charles Mathias (R-MD)
- Richard Schweiker (R-PA)

Governors

- Elmer L. Andersen
- John Chafee (R-RI)
- John A. Love (R-CO)
- Nelson Rockefeller (R-NY)

Committeemen

- Robert R. Snodgrass (R-GA)

State legislators

- Robert Cloer (R-GA)
List of Henry Cabot Lodge Jr. endorsements
- Prescott Bush (R-CT)
List of Margaret Chase Smith endorsements
- George Aiken (R-VT)

== National Convention ==
=== Post-primary maneuvering ===
Moderate Republicans moved into action as it appeared more and more likely that Goldwater was headed for a first ballot victory. Senator Hugh Scott started a movement to draft Governor Scranton on June 6, hoping that Scranton could pull together all the liberal and moderate Republicans. The following day, Scranton stopped to visit former President Eisenhower while on his way to the National Governors Conference in Cleveland; Ike encouraged Scranton to officially enter the race. Scranton finally joined the race on June 12. Rockefeller dropped out on June 15 and endorsed Scranton.

In the background, local Republicans continued to choose their national convention delegates. In the week between June 7 and June 13, 13 states chose 225 delegates. The many uncommitted delegates began to slowly announce their intentions; on June 9, 16 from Florida announced for Goldwater.

Scranton made a swing throughout the nation to speak with as many delegates as possible. Scranton gradually worked the moderate delegates who preferred Goldwater to Rockefeller and won endorsements in Ohio and Maryland. Michigan's Governor Romney announced that the state's delegation would meet separately with Goldwater and Scranton before deciding how to vote. Romney hoped the delegation would remain uncommitted. A staunch supporter of the Civil Rights Bill, Romney claimed that Goldwater's nomination would lead to the "suicidal destruction of the Republican Party".

On occasion, Goldwater returned to the Senate for votes. He gave a speech on June 18 in which he stated that he would vote against the Civil Rights bill. Senator Keating said that Goldwater's position was a repudiation of Abraham Lincoln and founding principles of the Republican Party. Governor Scranton held large rallies in eastern states while visiting with the delegates; he decried Goldwater's position on civil rights and challenged Goldwater to a debate, which Goldwater dismissed as "ridiculous". With time slipping away, and with Scranton failing to gain ground, he purchased a 30-minute time segment on NBC that aired on July 7 (replacing an episode of "Moment of Fear," a program starring Ronald Reagan). When the program aired, Scranton was unable to set forth his policy differences with Goldwater and spent too much time discussing smears from the Goldwater forces.

=== The Cow Palace ===
The 28th Republican National Convention was held in the Cow Palace, Daly City CA, from July 13 to July 16. The Cow Palace had been constructed in 1941, and the 1956 Republican National Convention had been held there. Following a $3 million improvement project in 1963, the Cow Palace applied to host the national convention and was chosen by Republican leaders over Chicago, Miami Beach, and four other cities.

As the convention opened, the delegates ignored the turmoil among Republican ranks elsewhere in the nation. AP polled all delegates and found that Goldwater had a comfortable majority of them, even as a Gallup poll showed Scranton leading Goldwater among nationwide Republicans by a 60-34% margin. Goldwater rejected a last offer by Scranton to debate, and Senator Margaret C. Smith arrived at the convention still campaigning for delegate support.

The convention was organized at the first session. RNC Chairman William E. Miller called the convention to order at 10:00 a.m. Pacific Time on 7/13. The delegates were greeted by various party officials with short speeches. Delegate Newton I. Steers of Maryland introduced a resolution that would ban any delegate or alternate chosen with racially discriminatory procedures, but it was voted down.

The evening session was devoted to speeches. RNC Chairman Miller prophesied that Republicans would have a "fair" convention and would win the fall election. Senator Everett Dirksen read a letter from former President Hoover, who was in failing health. Two actors read patriotic statements from earlier politicians while "America the Beautiful" played in the background. Oregon Governor Mark Hatfield then delivered the keynote address. He set forth the party's case for defeating LBJ and spoke out against extremism and the "bigots in this nation who spew forth their venom of hate."

The second day was consumed with speeches and the platform vote. The convention was formally organized in the morning, with Senator Morton giving a speech "laying" the "dirty linen" of the Johnson administration on the line. President Eisenhower encouraged stronger local government and discouraged extremism. That evening, the entire platform was read during prime time. When finished, Senator Hugh Scott offered the first amendment at 10:00 p.m., condemning the Ku Klux Klan, the Communist Party, and the John Birch Society. Governor Rockefeller sought to address the convention on this amendment, and this is when the Goldwater delegates issued their loud "boos" to drown him out. The convention took a standing vote to defeat the measure. Scott then offered a stronger civil rights plank, which was defeated 897–409. Goldwater supporters voted down several other minor amendments, and at 12:36 a.m., the proposed platform was approved.

=== The presidential nomination ===
On the third day of the convention, the presidential nominations and balloting took place. Senator Dirksen placed Goldwater in nomination. Goldwater delegates held a 30-minute demonstration at the end of his speech. Senator Kenneth B. Keating nominated Gov. Rockefeller, and a state senator nominated Senator Hiram Fong. Senator George D. Aiken placed Margaret C. Smith in nomination, saying that she was "the best qualified person you ever voted for" as he made history by being the first person to place the name of a woman into the presidential nomination by a major party. Ike's brother Milton Eisenhower placed Governor Scranton in nomination, hoping that "these perilous days" would not grant the Republican Party the same fate as the Whig Party of the preceding century. Representative Gerald R. Ford placed Governor Romney in nomination, calling him "Michigan's leading citizen." Judd and Lodge were then placed in nomination, though Morton read a letter from Lodge, who wished for his name to be withdrawn.

The roll call followed. Goldwater took the lead with Alabama and never lost it. When South Carolina was called, the chairman realized that his state would put Goldwater over the top. The chairman said "we are humbly grateful that we can do this for America." At the end of the ballot, Goldwater had 883 votes to just 214 for Scranton, 114 for Rockefeller, and 97 for all others. Most delegates switched their votes to Goldwater. Then Governor Scranton took the stage. He called for the nomination to be made unanimous, calling on his supporters "not to desert our party but to strengthen it."

The presidential tally was as follows:

Presidential balloting, RNC 1964
Ballot	1st before shifts	1st after shifts
Barry Goldwater	883	1,220
William Scranton	214	50
Nelson Rockefeller	114	6
George Romney	41	1
Margaret Chase Smith	27	22
Walter Judd	22	1
Hiram Fong	5	5
Henry Cabot Lodge Jr.	2	3

=== Vice presidential nomination and close ===
==== Nominee ====
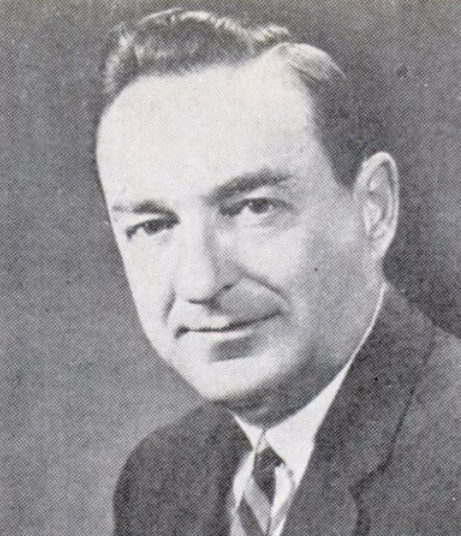
Representative William E. Miller of New York

The last day of the convention wrapped up the business. First was the vice presidential ballot. Charles H. Percy, candidate for governor of Illinois, placed RNC Chairman William E. Miller into nomination for vice president. Miller was well known for his debating skills in the U.S. House, where he had been one of LBJ's harshest critics. He also came from New York State, an attempt by Goldwater to show support for his policies in the northeast. Miller was nominated with 1,305 votes to three abstentions from Tennessee from delegates who believed that the convention should have had the ability to nominate whomever they wanted. Miller gave a short speech accepting "the greatest challenge of my lifetime."

Richard Nixon then introduced Goldwater for his acceptance speech. He said "Before this convention, we were Goldwater Republicans, Rockefeller Republicans, Scranton Republicans, Lodge Republicans, but now that this convention has met and made its decision, we are Republicans, period, working for Barry Goldwater for President of the United States."

In his acceptance speech, Goldwater set forth the "cause of Republicanism." His most famous passage was "Today ... the task of preserving and enlarging freedom at home and of safeguarding it from the forces of tyranny abroad is great enough to challenge all our resources and to re-fire all our strength. Anyone who wants to join us in all sincerity, we welcome. Those who do not care for our cause, we don't expect to enter our ranks in any case. And let our Republicanism, so focused and so dedicated, not be made fuzzy and futile by un-thinking and stupid labels. I would remind you that extremism in the defense of liberty is no vice. And let me remind you also that moderation in the pursuit of justice is no virtue." For many GOP moderates, Goldwater's speech was seen as a deliberate insult, and many of these moderates would defect to the Democrats in the fall election.

== See also ==
- 1964 Democratic Party presidential primaries
