= 1964 New Hampshire Republican presidential primary =

- March 10, 1964
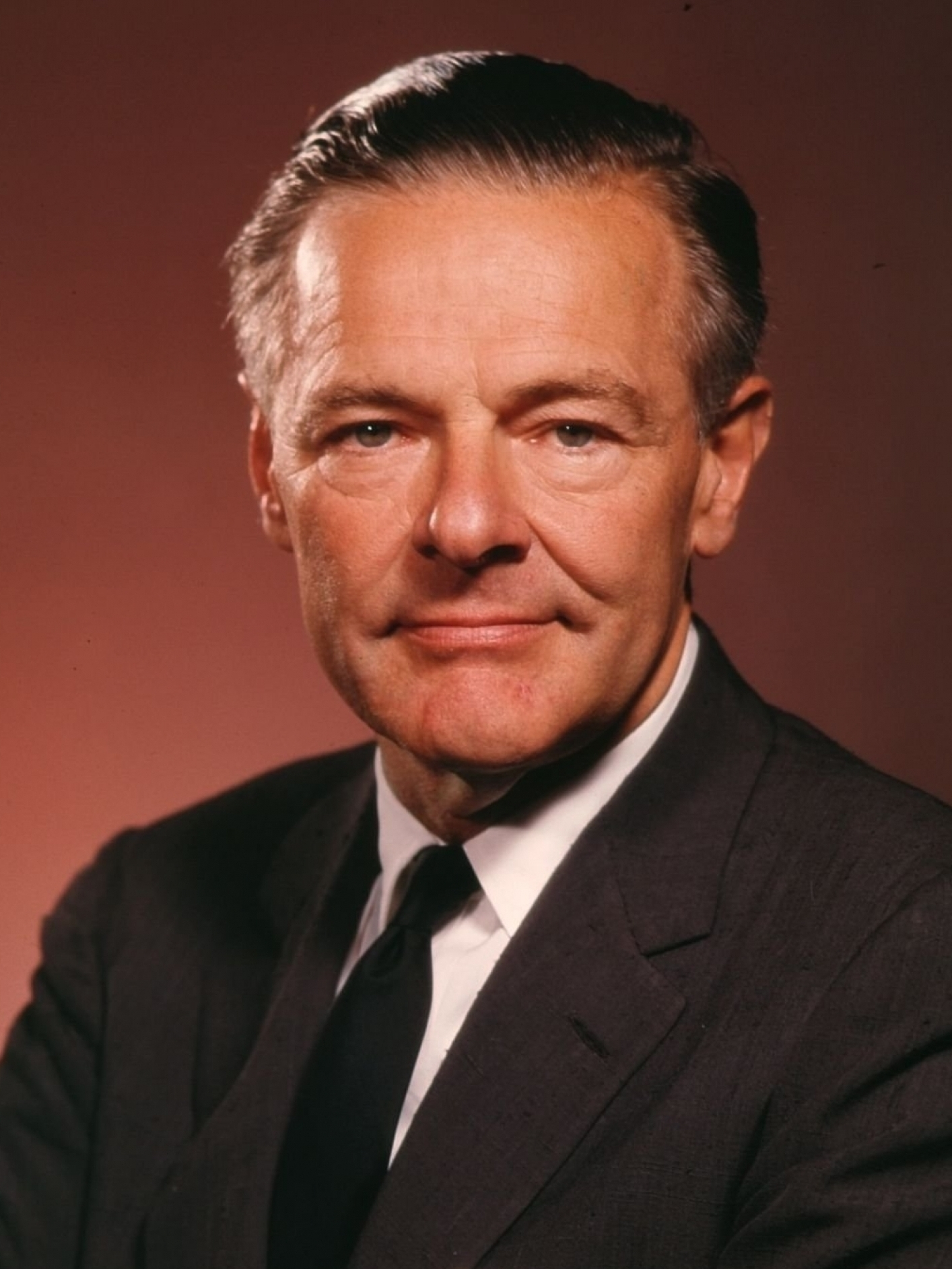

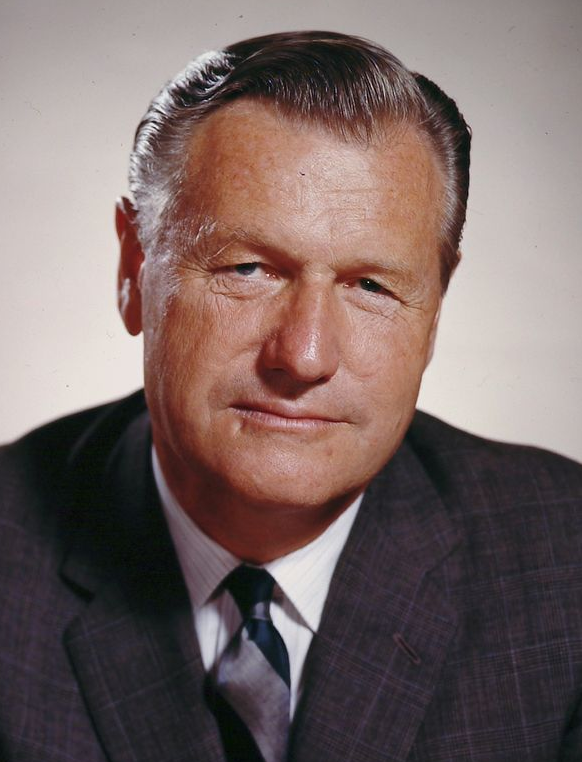

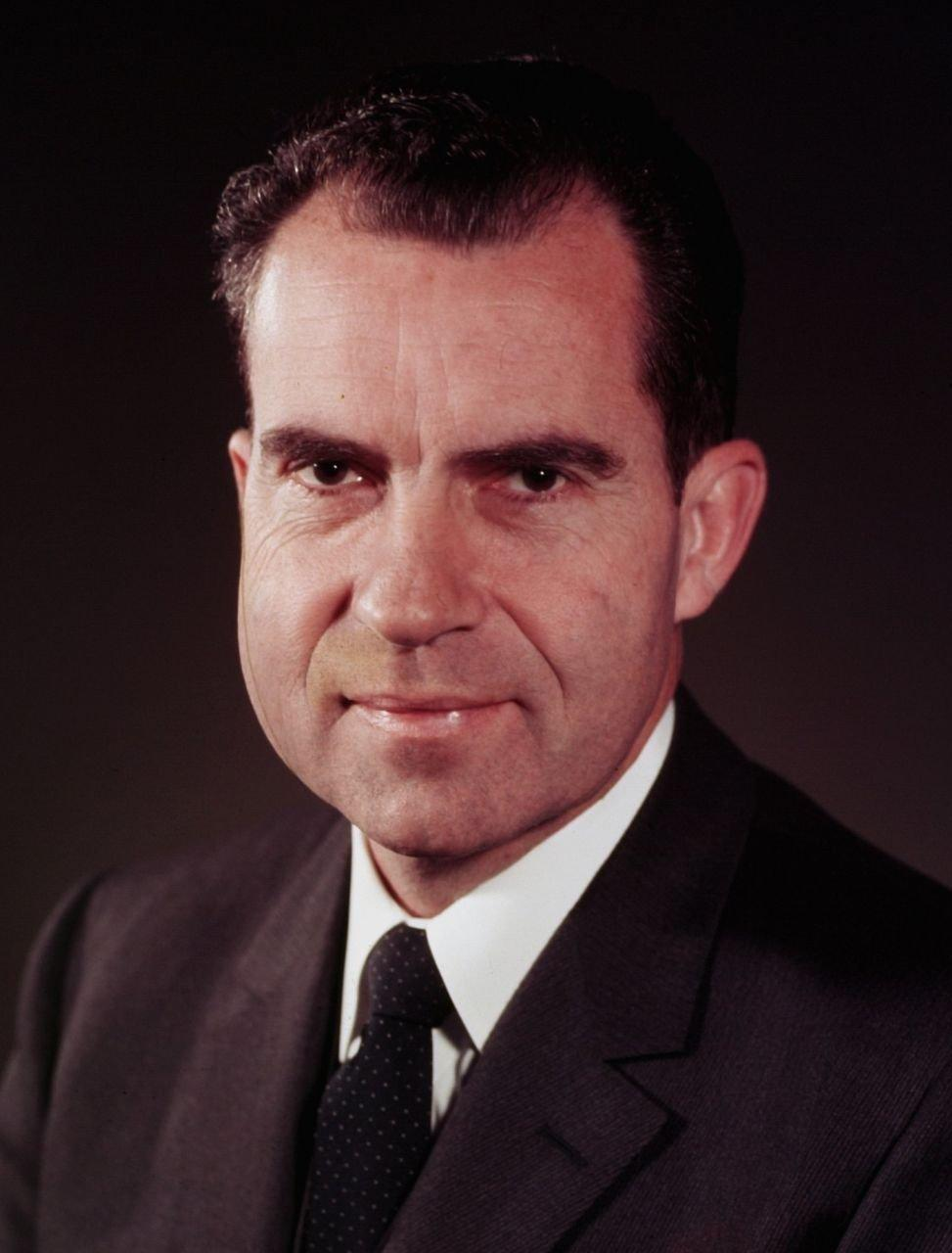
Candidate	Henry Cabot Lodge Jr. (write-in)	Barry Goldwater
Home state	Massachusetts	Arizona
Popular vote	33,007	20,692
Percentage	35.6%	22.3%
Candidate	Nelson Rockefeller	Richard Nixon (write-in)
Home state	New York	California
Popular vote	19,504	15,587
Percentage	21.0%	16.8%
- County results Lodge: 20-30% 30-40% 40-50% Rockefeller: 20-30% Nixon: 20-30%

The 1964 New Hampshire Republican presidential primary was held on March 10, 1964, in New Hampshire as one of the Republican Party's statewide nomination contests ahead of the 1964 United States presidential election. Former Massachusetts senator, Ambassador to the United Nations, and running mate to Richard Nixon in the 1960 election Henry Cabot Lodge Jr won as a write-in candidate with 36% of the vote. Behind him in second place was eventual 1964 GOP nominee Barry Goldwater, who finished with 22% of the vote. In third place was Nelson Rockefeller of New York and in fourth was Richard Nixon, who was also a write-in and did not contend for the nomination.
