= Robert Cloer =

American politician (1930–2024)

Bob C. Cloer
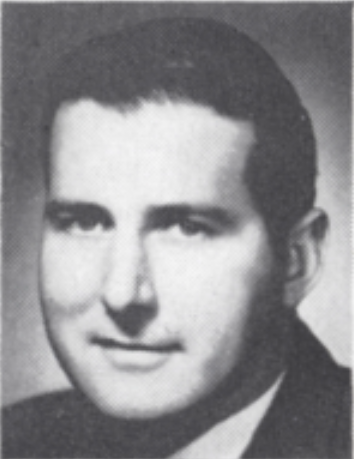

Member of the Georgia House of Representatives from the 126th district
- In office January 9, 1961 – January 14, 1963
- Preceded by: Ed Hedden
- Succeeded by: John Acree

Personal details
- Born: December 27, 1930 Riverton, Wyoming, U.S.
- Died: July 26, 2024 (aged 93)
- Party: Republican
- Spouse: Joyce Ann Burket (m. 1954; died 1958)
- Children: 1
- Education: Bob Jones University; University of Georgia Law School

Robert Cline Cloer (December 27, 1930 – July 26, 2024) was an American politician who served in the Georgia House of Representatives as a Republican representing Towns County from 1961 to 1963.

== Early life ==
Cloer was born on December 27, 1930, in Riverton, Wyoming, the son of Wiley C. Cloer and Bessie Ann (Tatham) Cloer. He graduated from Towns County High School in 1945. He attended Bob Jones University where he graduated with a B.S. degree in 1954. Afterwards, he attended the University of Georgia Law School and graduated with a LL.B. degree in 1957.

== Political career ==
In 1962, he was one of the first in the legislature to introduce a bill to repeal the county unit system. He also offered a bill that would abolish the rotation system, so that the state districts would elect a state senator on a district wide basis. That same year, he was considered a potential Republican nominee for lieutenant governor. He was defeated for reelection by a margin of 1,311 to 958, losing to John Acree. In 1964, he opposed the candidacy of Barry Goldwater for president, and was notable among the few in the Georgia delegation committed to William Scranton.

== Personal life and death ==
Cloer married his wife Joyce Ann Burket on June 6, 1954, in Tipton, Indiana. They had one daughter. In 1958, his wife died from complications of a heart attack.

Cloer died on July 26, 2024, at the age of 93.
