= 1964 Republican Party vice presidential candidate selection =

1964 Republican vice presidential nomination
- July 16, 1964
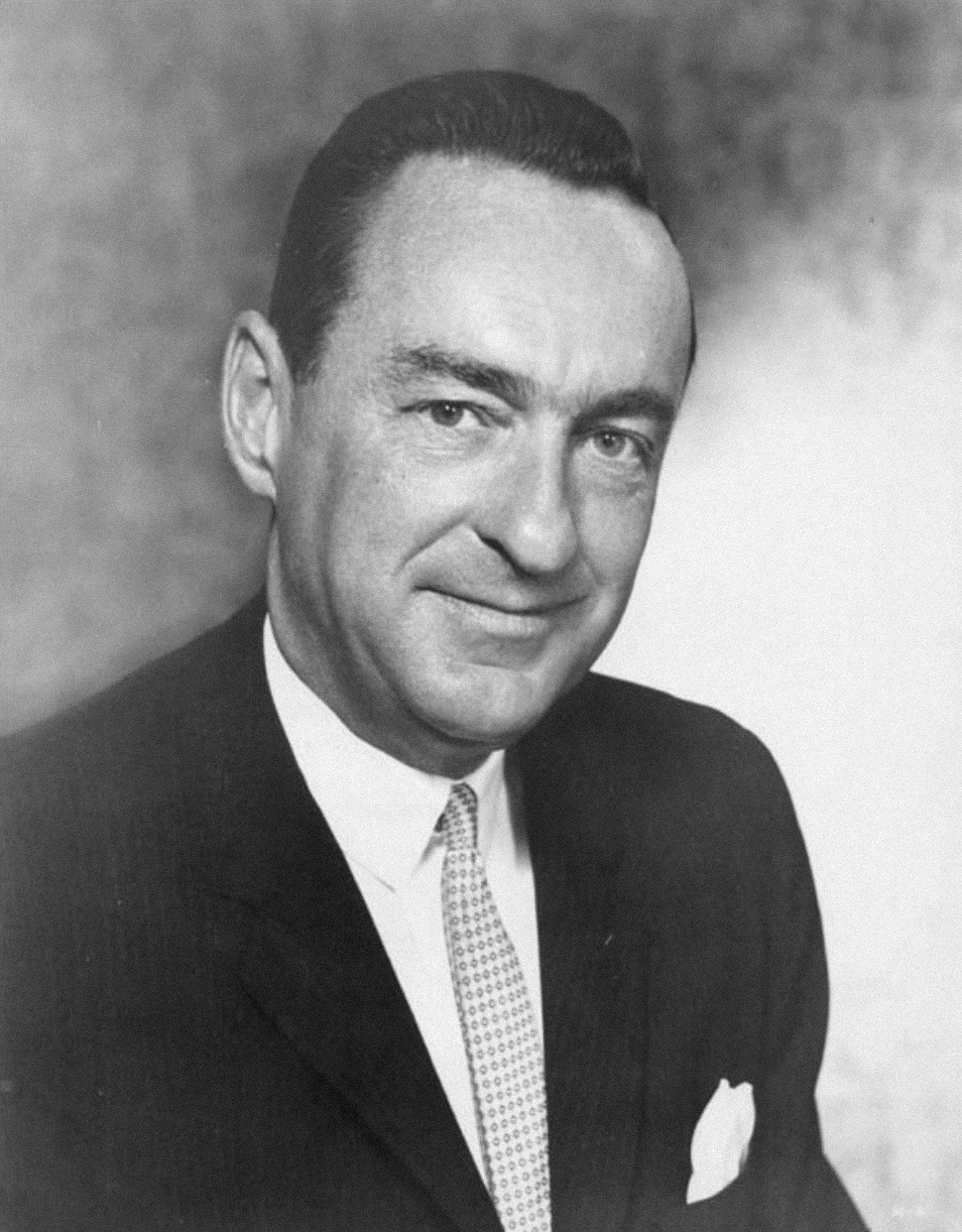
Nominee	William E. Miller
Home state	New York
Previous Vice Presidential nominee
Henry Cabot Lodge Jr.
Vice Presidential nominee
William E. Miller

Republican presidential nominee, Senator Barry Goldwater of Arizona chose Representative William E. Miller of New York as his vice presidential running mate. The Goldwater–Miller ticket would lose the 1964 election to the Democratic ticket of Johnson–Humphrey.

== Potential running mates ==
=== Finalists ===
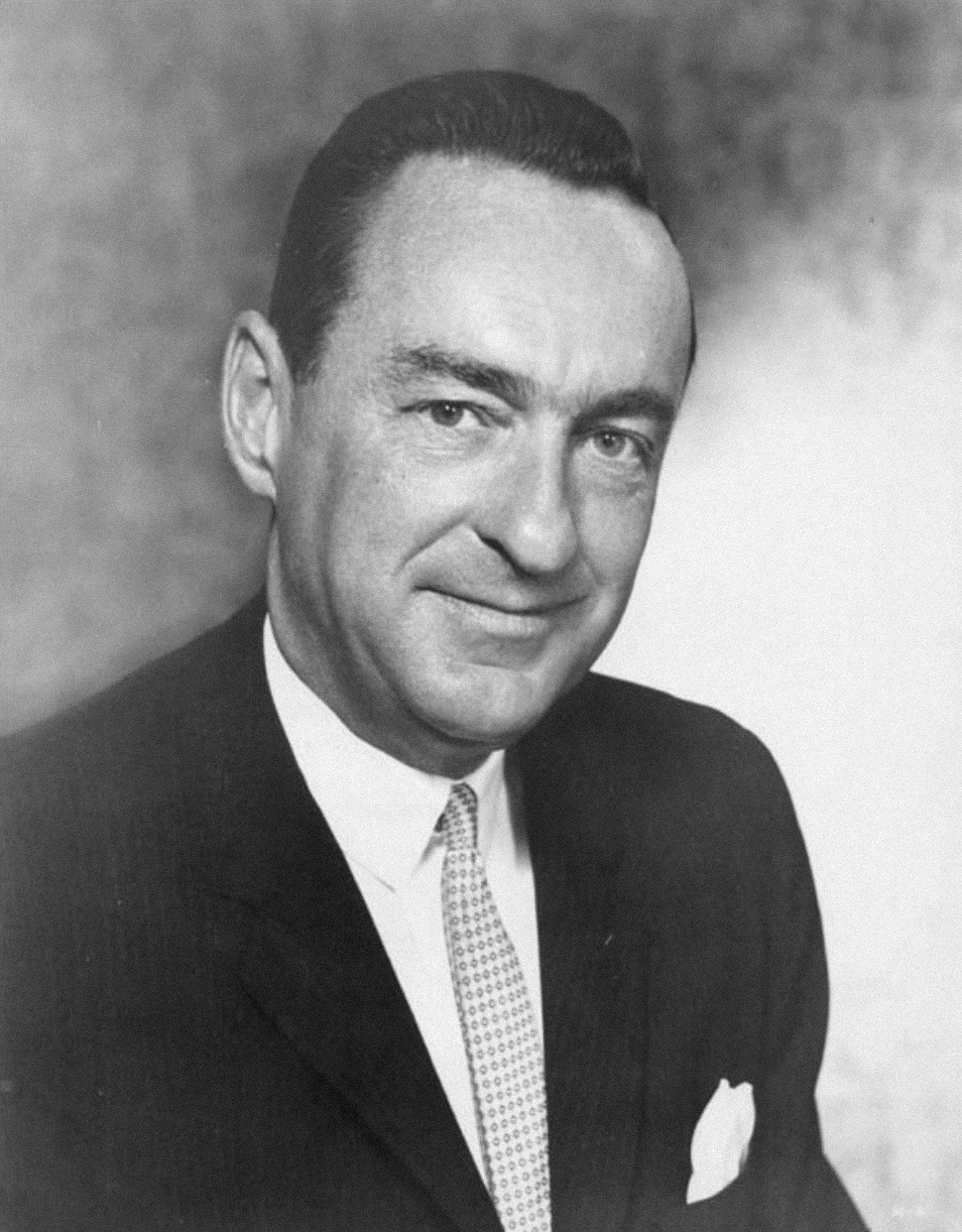
Representative
William Miller
from New York
(1951–1965)

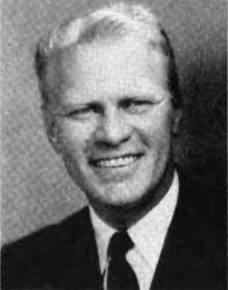
Representative
Gerald Ford
from Michigan
(1949–1973)

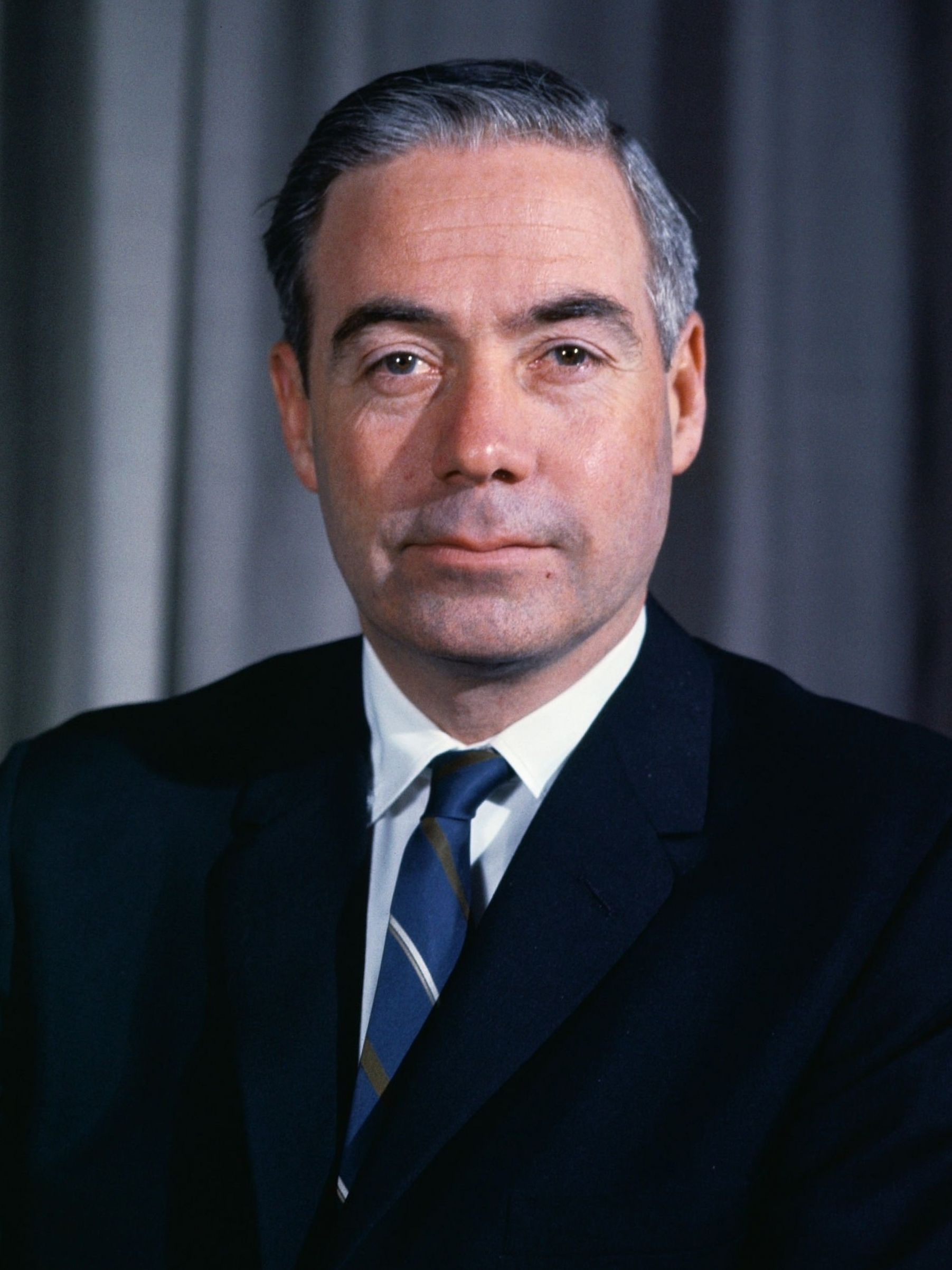
Governor
William Scranton
of Pennsylvania
(1963–1967)

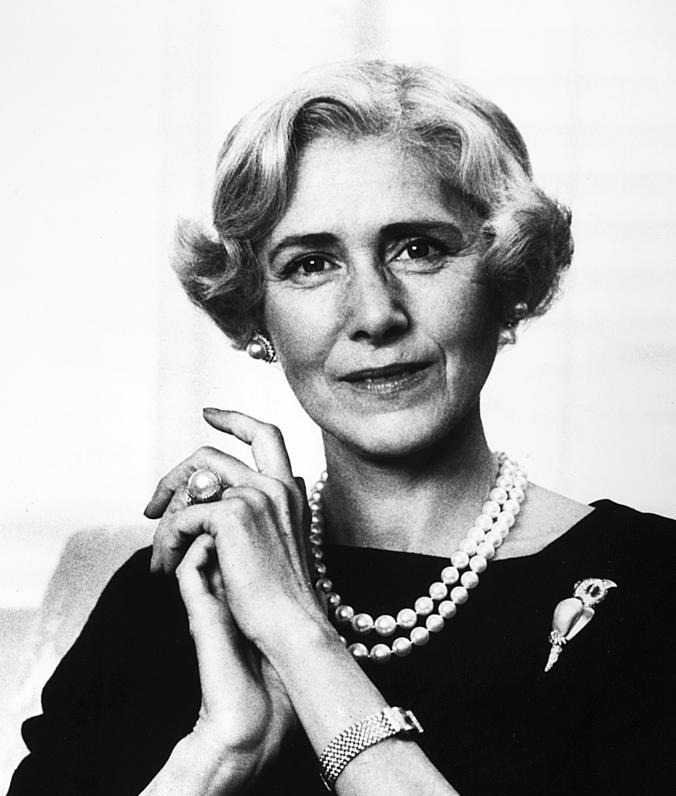
Former Representative
Clare Boothe Luce
from Connecticut
(1943–1947)

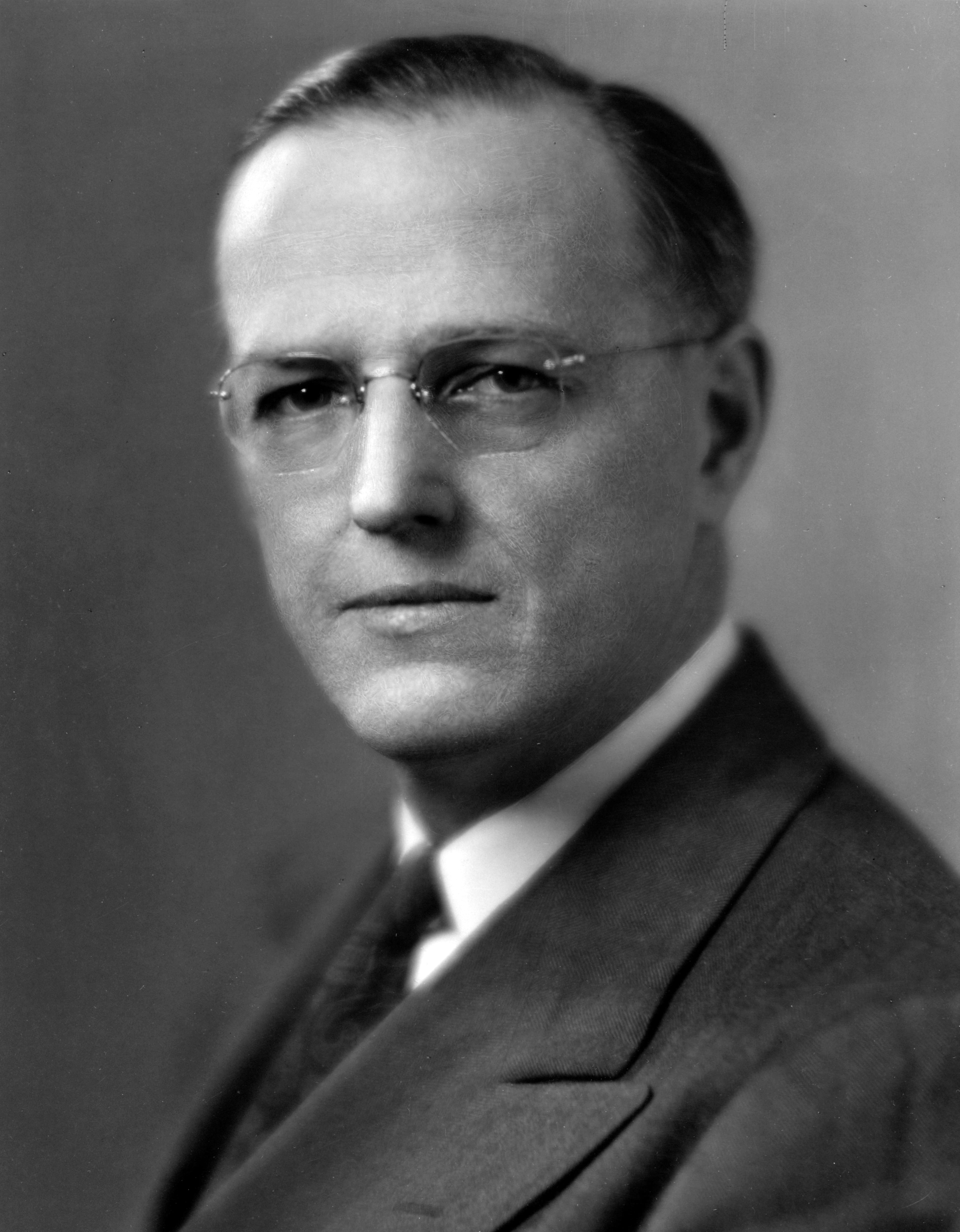
Former Representative
Walter Judd
from Minnesota
(1943–1963)
