= Robert R. Snodgrass =

American politician (1902–1969)

Personal details
- Born: July 12, 1902 Indian Territory, U.S.
- Died: October 31, 1969 (aged 67) Atlanta, Georgia, U.S.
- Party: Republican
- Spouse(s): Mildred Snodgrass (m. 1928; div. 1956) Mildred Reinhertz (m. 1956)
- Education: University of Michigan

Robert Richard Snodgrass (July 12, 1902 – October 31, 1969) was an American businessman and politician who served as a Republican Party leader and committeeman from Georgia.

== Early life ==
Robert R. Snodgrass was born on July 12, 1902, in the Indian Territory to John R. Snodgrass, who was a baseball player. He attended law school at the University of Michigan and later moved to Atlanta in 1930. In 1940, he founded the Atlas Finance Company, serving as its chair and president until 1966 when he retired and sold off his company. He was the president of the Atlanta Chamber of Commerce, and head of the Atlanta Traffic Committee, promoting safe traffic practices.

== Political career ==
Robert Snodgrass was first involved in politics when he was instrumental in building the Georgia Republican Party in the 1940s alongside Elbert Tuttle. He campaigned for Thomas E. Dewey in 1948. He would be instrumental in campaigning for Dwight D. Eisenhower in 1952 and 1956. He was a member of the "Atlanta faction" of the Republican Party in Georgia, which was composed of moderate, business minded intellectuals within the party during the Eisenhower years. In 1964, following the nomination of Barry Goldwater on the Republican ticket, he gave a speech before the Atlanta Rotary Club condemning the growing influence of segregationists, the Ku Klux Klan, and the John Birch Society within the party. Snodgrass would retire from politics in 1964 following the party's takeover by Goldwater supporters. He would go on to support William Scranton for the Republican nomination.

In contrast to fellow Georgia Republicans, Snodgrass was a moderate Republican, and would go on to support the presidential bids of George W. Romney and Nelson Rockefeller in 1968.

== Personal life ==
Snodgrass married his first wife, Mildred Snodgrass, on February 4, 1928. She was involved in Georgia Republican politics, serving as national committeewoman. They divorced on March 9, 1956. He married his second wife, Mildred Reinhertz, on May 28, 1956.

He was a member of the Atlanta Rotary Club, and board member of the American Industrial Bankers Association.

He died on October 31, 1969, in Atlanta, aged 67 due to a heart attack.
