= 1964 United States presidential election =

Election of Lyndon B. Johnson

- November 3, 1964

538 members of the Electoral College 270 electoral votes needed to win
- Turnout: 62.8% (▼1.0 pp)

Nominee	Lyndon B. Johnson	Barry Goldwater
Party	Democratic	Republican
Home state	Texas	Arizona
Running mate	Hubert Humphrey	William E. Miller
Electoral vote	486	52
States carried	44 + DC	6
Popular vote	43,129,040	27,175,754
Percentage	61.1%	38.5%
- Presidential election results map. Blue denotes states won by Johnson/Humphrey and red denotes those won by Goldwater/Miller. Numbers indicate electoral votes cast by each state and the District of Columbia.
President before election
Lyndon B. Johnson
Democratic
Elected President
Lyndon B. Johnson
Democratic

A presidential election was held in the United States on November 3, 1964, less than a year after the assassination of John F. Kennedy, who won the previous presidential election. The Democratic ticket of incumbent President Lyndon B. Johnson and Senator Hubert Humphrey defeated the Republican ticket of Senator Barry Goldwater and Congressman William E. Miller in a landslide victory. Johnson won 61.1% of the popular vote, the highest popular vote percentage in American presidential election history since 1820.

Johnson took office on November 22, 1963, following Kennedy's assassination, and generally continued his policies, except with greater emphasis on civil rights. He easily defeated a primary challenge from segregationist Alabama governor George Wallace to win the nomination. At the 1964 Democratic National Convention, Johnson selected liberal Minnesota senator Hubert Humphrey as his running mate. In the narrow Republican primary contest, conservative Arizona senator Barry Goldwater defeated liberal New York governor Nelson Rockefeller and Pennsylvania governor William Scranton.

Johnson championed a series of anti-poverty programs, collectively known as the Great Society, and his passage of the Civil Rights Act of 1964. Goldwater espoused a low-tax, small-government philosophy with an aggressive foreign policy. Although he personally opposed segregation and previously supported the Civil Rights Act of 1957 and 1960, Goldwater opposed the Civil Rights Act of 1964, saying it was unconstitutional. Democrats successfully portrayed Goldwater as a dangerous extremist; the "Daisy" television advertisement implied that he would be likely to wage a nuclear war. The Republican Party was divided between its moderate and conservative factions, with Rockefeller and other moderate party leaders refusing to campaign for Goldwater. During the campaign, the CIA was ordered to collect information on the Goldwater campaign and the Republican National Committee.

Johnson became the fourth and most recent vice president to succeed the presidency following the death of his predecessor and win a full term in his own right. (Note: The previous three were Theodore Roosevelt, Calvin Coolidge, and Harry S. Truman.) After leading in all the polls during the campaign, Johnson carried 44 states and the District of Columbia, which voted for the first time in this election. Goldwater won his home state and swept the five states of the Deep South, due to the Democratic Party's strong support of civil rights and desegregation. With the exception of Louisiana voting for Dwight D. Eisenhower in 1956, the Deep South states had never previously voted for a Republican presidential candidate since the end of Reconstruction in 1877.

This was the last election in which the Democratic Party won a majority of the white vote, with 59% of white voters casting their ballot for Johnson over Goldwater. This was the last election in which the Democratic nominee carried Idaho, Utah, Wyoming, North Dakota, South Dakota, Nebraska, (Note: Three Democrats (Barack Obama in 2008, Joe Biden in 2020, and Kamala Harris in 2024) have since won an electoral vote from Nebraska's 2nd Congressional District, but Johnson remains the last Democrat to carry the state as a whole.) Kansas, or Oklahoma, and the only election ever in which the Democrats carried Alaska. This marked the first presidential election in history in which the Democrats carried Vermont, and conversely, the first in which the Republicans carried Georgia. As of 2024, this marks the last time that a Democratic presidential candidate has won more than 400 electoral votes, as well as 40 or more states.

== Assassination of President John F. Kennedy ==
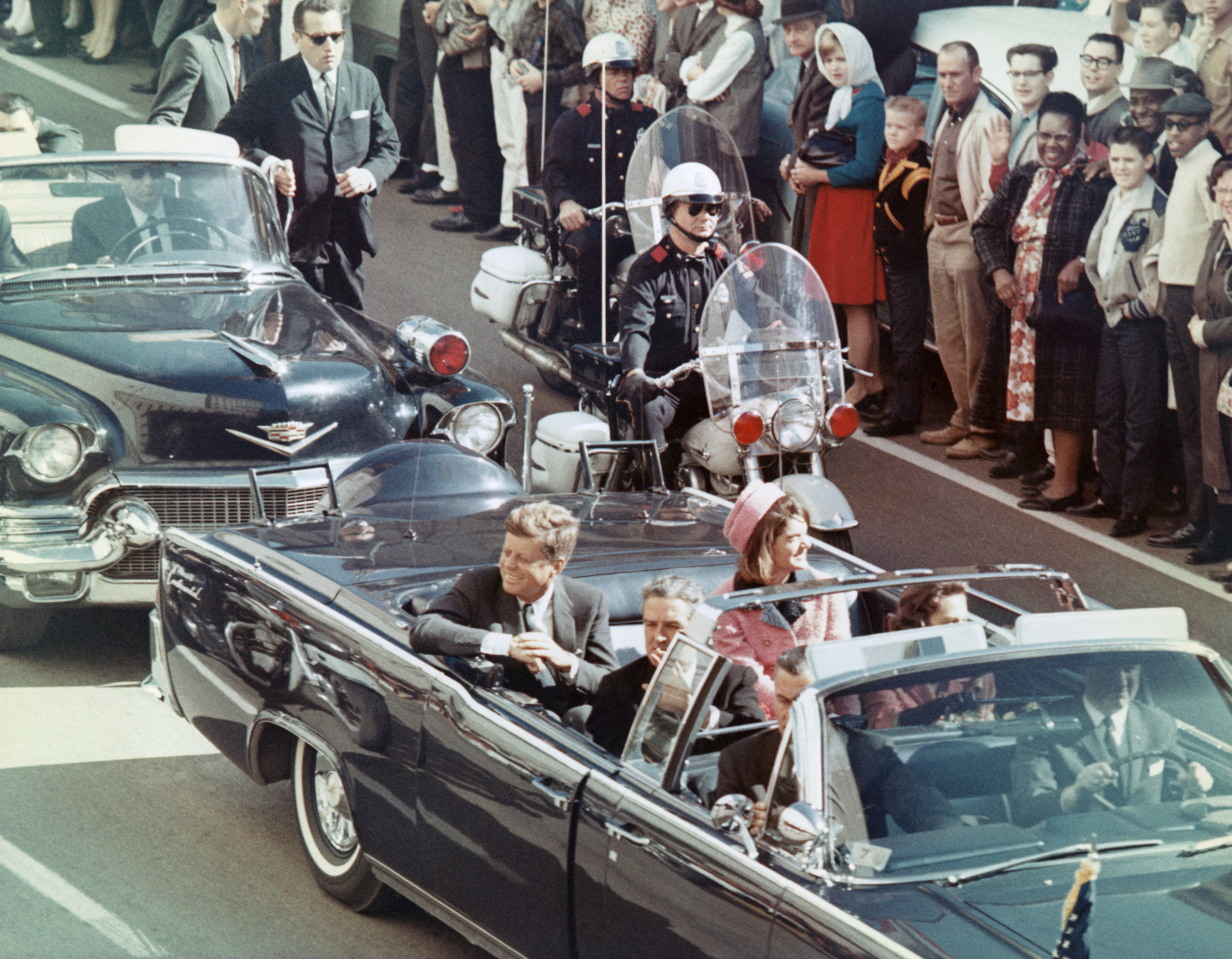
President John F. Kennedy in the Dallas motorcade moments before his assassination

On November 22, 1963, President John F. Kennedy was assassinated in Dallas, Texas, and Vice President Lyndon B. Johnson became president immediately following the assassination under the presidential succession line.

Kennedy's death triggered widespread shock and grief, while opposing candidates were put in the awkward position of running against Johnson following the assassination.

During the national period of mourning, Republican leaders called for a political moratorium, so they would not appear to be disrespectful to Kennedy or Johnson. As such, little political activities were done by the candidates of either major party until January 1964, when the primary season officially began. At the time, most political pundits saw Kennedy's assassination as leaving the nation politically unsettled.

== Nominations ==
=== Democratic Party ===
Democratic Party (United States) 1964 Democratic Party ticket
Lyndon B. Johnson	Hubert Humphrey
for President	for Vice President
36th President of the United States (1963–1969)	U.S. Senator from Minnesota (1949–1964)
Campaign

==== Candidates ====
President
Lyndon B. Johnson
(1963–1969)

Governor
George Wallace
of Alabama
(1963–1967, 1971–1979, 1983–1987)

Until around the time of the convention, President Johnson insisted that he was undecided about seeking a second term, leading supporters in primaries to either write him in as a candidate or vote for Favorite sons. All of these "favorite sons" ultimately endorsed Johnson. This led to Johnson ultimately receiving 88.41% of the vote through his surrogates despite formally receiving only 17.8% of the vote.

The only candidate other than President Johnson to actively campaign was then-Alabama Governor George Wallace, who ran in a number of northern primaries, though his candidacy was geared more towards promoting the philosophy of states' rights among a northern audience. While expecting support from delegations in the South, Wallace had "no illusions" that he was in contention for the presidency.

==== The Mississippi Delegation ====
At the national convention, the integrated Mississippi Freedom Democratic Party (MFDP) claimed the seats for delegates for Mississippi, not on the grounds of Party rules, but because the official Mississippi delegation had been elected by a white primary system. The national party's liberal leaders supported an even division of the seats between the two Mississippi delegations; Johnson was concerned that, while the regular Democrats of Mississippi would probably vote for Goldwater anyway, rejecting them would lose him the South. Eventually, Hubert Humphrey, Walter Reuther, and the black civil rights leaders, including Roy Wilkins, Martin Luther King Jr., and Bayard Rustin, worked out a compromise: The MFDP took two seats; the regular Mississippi delegation was required to pledge to support the party ticket; and no future Democratic convention would accept a delegation chosen by a discriminatory poll. Joseph L. Rauh Jr., the MFDP's lawyer, initially refused this deal, but they eventually took their seats. Many white delegates from Mississippi and Alabama refused to sign any pledge, and left the convention; and many young civil rights workers were offended by any compromise. Johnson biographers Rowland Evans and Robert Novak claim that the MFDP fell under the influence of "black radicals" and rejected their seats. Johnson would later lose Louisiana, Alabama, Mississippi, Georgia, and South Carolina in the general election.

==== Vice-Presidential selection ====
Johnson also faced trouble from Robert F. Kennedy, President Kennedy's younger brother and the U.S. Attorney General. Kennedy and Johnson's relationship was troubled from the time Robert Kennedy was a Senate staffer. Then-Majority Leader Johnson surmised that Kennedy's hostility was the direct result of the fact that Johnson frequently recounted a story that embarrassed the family patriarch, Joseph P. Kennedy, formerly the ambassador to the United Kingdom. According to his recounting, Johnson and President Franklin D. Roosevelt misled the ambassador, upon a return visit to the United States, to believe Roosevelt wished to meet in Washington for friendly purposes; in fact, Roosevelt planned to — and did — fire the ambassador, due to the latter's well-publicized views. The hostility between Johnson and Robert Kennedy was rendered mutual in the 1960 primaries and the 1960 Democratic National Convention, when Kennedy tried to prevent Johnson from becoming his brother's running mate.

In early 1964, despite his personal animosity for the president, Kennedy tried to force Johnson to accept him as his running mate. Johnson eliminated this threat by announcing that none of his cabinet members would be considered for second place on the Democratic ticket. Johnson also became concerned that Kennedy might use his scheduled speech at the 1964 Democratic Convention to create a groundswell of emotion among the delegates to make him Johnson's running mate; he prevented this by deliberately scheduling Kennedy's speech on the last day of the convention, after his running mate had already been chosen. Shortly after the 1964 Democratic Convention, Kennedy decided to leave Johnson's cabinet and run for the U.S. Senate in New York; he won the general election in November. Johnson chose United States Senator Hubert Humphrey from Minnesota, a liberal and civil rights activist, as his running mate.

=== Republican Party ===
Republican Party (United States) 1964 Republican Party ticket
Barry Goldwater	William E. Miller
for President	for Vice President
U.S. Senator from Arizona (1953–1965, 1969–1987)	U.S. Representative from New York (1951–1965)
Campaign

==== Candidates ====
In order of delegates and votes won
Barry Goldwater	William Scranton	Margaret Chase Smith	Nelson Rockefeller	Hiram Fong	Henry Cabot Lodge Jr.	George W. Romney	Walter Judd
U.S Senator from Arizona (1953–65, 1969–87)	Governor of Pennsylvania (1963–67)	U.S. Senator from Maine (1949–73)	Governor of New York (1959–73)	U.S Senator from Hawaii (1959–77)	Ambassador to the United Nations (1953–60)	Governor of Michigan (1963–69)	Former Representative from Minnesota (1943–63)
2,267,079 votes 1,220 PD	245,401 votes 50 PD	227.007 votes 22 PD	1,304,204 votes 6 PD	5 PD	386,661 votes 3 PD	1,955 votes 1 PD	1 PD
Harold Stassen	Jim Rhodes	John W. Byrnes					
Former Governor of Minnesota (1939–43)	Governor of Ohio (1963–71, 1975–83)	Representative from Wisconsin (1945–73)					
114,083 votes	615,754 votes	299,612 votes					

==== Primaries ====
Republican primaries results by state: No primary held John W. Byrnes Barry Goldwater Henry Cabot Lodge Jr. / Jim Rhodes Nelson Rockefeller William Scranton; Technically, in South Dakota and Florida, Goldwater finished in second to "Unpledged Delegates", but he finished before all other candidates.

The Republican Party (GOP) was badly divided in 1964 between its conservative and moderate-liberal factions. Former vice president Richard Nixon, who had been beaten by Kennedy in the 1960 presidential election, decided not to run. Nixon, a moderate with ties to both wings of the GOP, had been able to unite the factions in 1960; in his absence, the way was clear for the two factions to engage in a hard-fought campaign for the nomination. Barry Goldwater, a Senator from Arizona, was the champion of the conservatives. The conservatives had historically been based in the American Midwest, but beginning in the 1950s, they had been gaining in power in the South and West, and the core of Goldwater's support came from suburban conservative Republicans. The conservatives favored a low-tax, small federal government which supported individual rights and business interests, and opposed social welfare programs. They also supported an internationalist and interventionist foreign policy. The conservatives resented the dominance of the GOP's moderate wing, which was based in the Northeastern United States. Since 1940, the Eastern moderates had defeated conservative presidential candidates at the GOP's national conventions. The conservatives believed the Eastern Republicans were little different from liberal Democrats in their philosophy and approach to government. Goldwater's chief opponent for the Republican nomination was Nelson Rockefeller, the Governor of New York and the long-time leader of the GOP's more moderate Rockefeller Republicans.

In 1961, a group of twenty-two conservatives, headed by Ohio Representative John M. Ashbrook, lawyer and National Review publisher William A. Rusher, and scholar F. Clifton White, met privately in Chicago to discuss the formation of a grass-roots organization to secure the nomination of a conservative as the 1964 Republican candidate. The main headquarters for the organization were established at Suite 3505 of the Chanin Building in New York City, leading members to refer to themselves as the "Suite 3505 Committee". Following the 1962 mid-term elections, they formally backed Goldwater, who notified them that he did not want to run for the presidency. In April 1963, they formed the Draft Goldwater Committee, chaired by Texas Republican Party Chairman Peter O'Donnell. The committee solidified growing conservative strength in the West and South, and began working to gain control of state parties in the Midwest from liberal Republicans. Throughout the rest of the year, speculation about a potential Goldwater candidacy grew, and grass-roots activism and efforts among conservative Republicans expanded.

Initially, Rockefeller was considered the front-runner, ahead of Goldwater. However, in 1963, two years after Rockefeller's divorce from his first wife, he was remarried to Margaretta "Happy" Murphy, who was nearly 18 years his junior and had just divorced her husband and surrendered her four children to his custody. The fact that Murphy had suddenly divorced her husband before marrying Rockefeller led to rumors that Rockefeller had been having an extra-marital affair with Margaretta. This angered many social conservatives and female voters within the GOP, many of whom called Rockefeller a "wife stealer". After his remarriage, Rockefeller's lead among Republicans lost 20 points overnight. Senator Prescott Bush of Connecticut, the father of future President George H. W. Bush and grandfather of future President George W. Bush, was among Rockefeller's critics on this issue: "Have we come to the point in our life as a nation where the governor of a great state — one who perhaps aspires to the nomination for president of the United States — can desert a good wife, mother of his grown children, divorce her, then persuade a young mother of four youngsters to abandon her husband and their four children and marry the governor?"

In the first primary, in New Hampshire, both Rockefeller and Goldwater were considered to be the favorites, but the voters instead gave a surprising victory to write-in candidate U.S. ambassador to South Vietnam, Henry Cabot Lodge Jr. who was Nixon's running mate in 1960 and a former Massachusetts senator. He went on to win the Massachusetts and New Jersey primaries, before withdrawing his candidacy because he had finally decided he did not want the Republican nomination.

Despite his defeat in New Hampshire, Goldwater pressed on, winning the Illinois, Texas, and Indiana primaries, with little opposition, and Nebraska's primary, after a stiff challenge from a draft-Nixon movement. Goldwater also won a number of state caucuses, and gathered even more delegates. Meanwhile, Nelson Rockefeller won the West Virginia and Oregon primaries against Goldwater, and William Scranton won in his home state of Pennsylvania. Both Rockefeller and Scranton also won several state caucuses, mostly in the Northeast.

The final showdown between Goldwater and Rockefeller was in the California primary. In spite of the previous accusations regarding his marriage, Rockefeller led Goldwater in most opinion polls in California, and he appeared headed for victory when his new wife gave birth to a son, Nelson Rockefeller Jr., three days before the primary. His son's birth brought the issue of adultery front and center, and Rockefeller suddenly lost ground in the polls. Combined with Goldwater conservatives' expanded dedicated efforts and superior organizing, Goldwater won the primary by a narrow 51–48% margin, thus eliminating Rockefeller as a serious contender and all but clinching the nomination. With Rockefeller's elimination, the party's moderates and liberals turned to William Scranton, the Governor of Pennsylvania, in the hopes that he could stop Goldwater. However, as the Republican Convention began, Goldwater was seen as the heavy favorite to win the nomination. This was notable, as it signified a shift to a more conservative-leaning Republican Party.

Total popular vote

- Barry Goldwater – 2,267,079 (38.33%)
- Nelson Rockefeller – 1,304,204 (22.05%)
- Jim Rhodes – 615,754 (10.41%)
- Henry Cabot Lodge Jr. – 386,661 (6.54%)
- John W. Byrnes – 299,612 (5.07%)
- William Scranton – 245,401 (4.15%)
- Margaret Chase Smith – 227,007 (3.84%)
- Richard Nixon – 197,212 (3.33%)
- Unpledged – 173,652 (2.94%)
- Harold Stassen – 114,083 (1.93%)
- Other – 58,933 (0.99%)
- Lyndon B. Johnson (write-in) – 23,406 (0.40%)
- George W. Romney – 1,955 (0.03%)

==== Convention ====
The 1964 Republican National Convention, July 13–16 at Daly City, California's Cow Palace arena, was one of the most bitter in Republican history. The party's moderates and conservatives openly expressed their contempt for each other. Rockefeller was loudly booed when he came to the podium for his speech; in his speech, he roundly criticized the party's conservatives, which led many conservatives in the galleries to yell and scream at him. A group of moderates tried to rally behind Scranton to stop Goldwater, but Goldwater's forces easily brushed his challenge aside, and Goldwater was nominated on the first ballot. The presidential tally was as follows:

- Barry Goldwater 883
- William Scranton 214
- Nelson Rockefeller 114
- George W. Romney 41
- Margaret Chase Smith 27
- Walter Judd 22
- Hiram Fong 5
- Henry Cabot Lodge Jr. 2

The vice-presidential nomination went to little-known Republican Party Chairman William E. Miller, a Representative from western New York. Goldwater stated that he chose Miller simply because "he drives [President] Johnson nuts". This would be the only Republican ticket from 1952 to 1972 that did not include Nixon.

In accepting his nomination, Goldwater uttered the phrase (suggested by speechwriter Harry Jaffa): "I would remind you that extremism in the defense of liberty is no vice. And let me remind you also that moderation in the pursuit of justice is no virtue." Goldwater's seeming admission of being an extremist alarmed many Moderates who would later vote for Johnson in the general election.

Following the convention many moderates, including Rockefeller, refused to endorse Goldwater.

== General election ==
=== Polling ===
Poll source	Date(s) administered	Lyndon Johnson (D)	Barry Goldwater (R)	Other	Undecided	Margin
Election Results	November 3, 1964	61.05%	38.47%	0.48%	-	22.58
Harris	November 2, 1964 (Note: The publication date is used, as the dates of the survey were not given in the source.)	62%	33%	-	5%	29
Gallup	October 25–30, 1964	64%	29%	-	7%	35
Harris	October 22, 1964	60%	34%	-	6%	26
Gallup	October 8–13, 1964	64%	29%	-	7%	35
Harris	October 11, 1964	58%	34%	-	8%	24
Gallup	September 18–23, 1964	62%	32%	-	6%	30
Harris	September 20, 1964	60%	32%	-	8%	28
Harris	September 2, 1964	59%	32%	-	9%	27
Gallup	Aug. 27-Sep. 2, 1964	65%	29%	-	6%	36
August 24–27: Democratic National Convention
Roper	August 23, 1964 (Note: The publication date is used, as the dates of the survey were not given in the source.)	67%	28%	-	5%	39
Harris	August 14, 1964	59%	32%	-	9%	27
Gallup	August 6–11, 1964	65%	29%	-	6%	36
Gallup	July 23–28, 1964	59%	31%	-	10%	28
Harris	July 23, 1964	61%	31%	-	8%	30
July 13–16: Republican National Convention
Gallup	July 5–10, 1964	62%	26%	-	12%	36
Gallup	June 25–30, 1964	76%	20%	-	4%	56
Gallup	June 11–16, 1964	77%	18%	-	5%	59
Harris	April 6, 1964	66%	26%	-	8%	48
Harris	February 17, 1964	64%	26%	-	10%	38
Gallup	January 2–7, 1964	75%	18%	-	7%	57
Gallup	December 12–17, 1963	75%	20%	-	5%	55
Harris	November 29, 1963	55%	33%	-	12%	22
Gallup	November 22–27, 1963	78%	19%	-	3%	59

=== Campaign ===
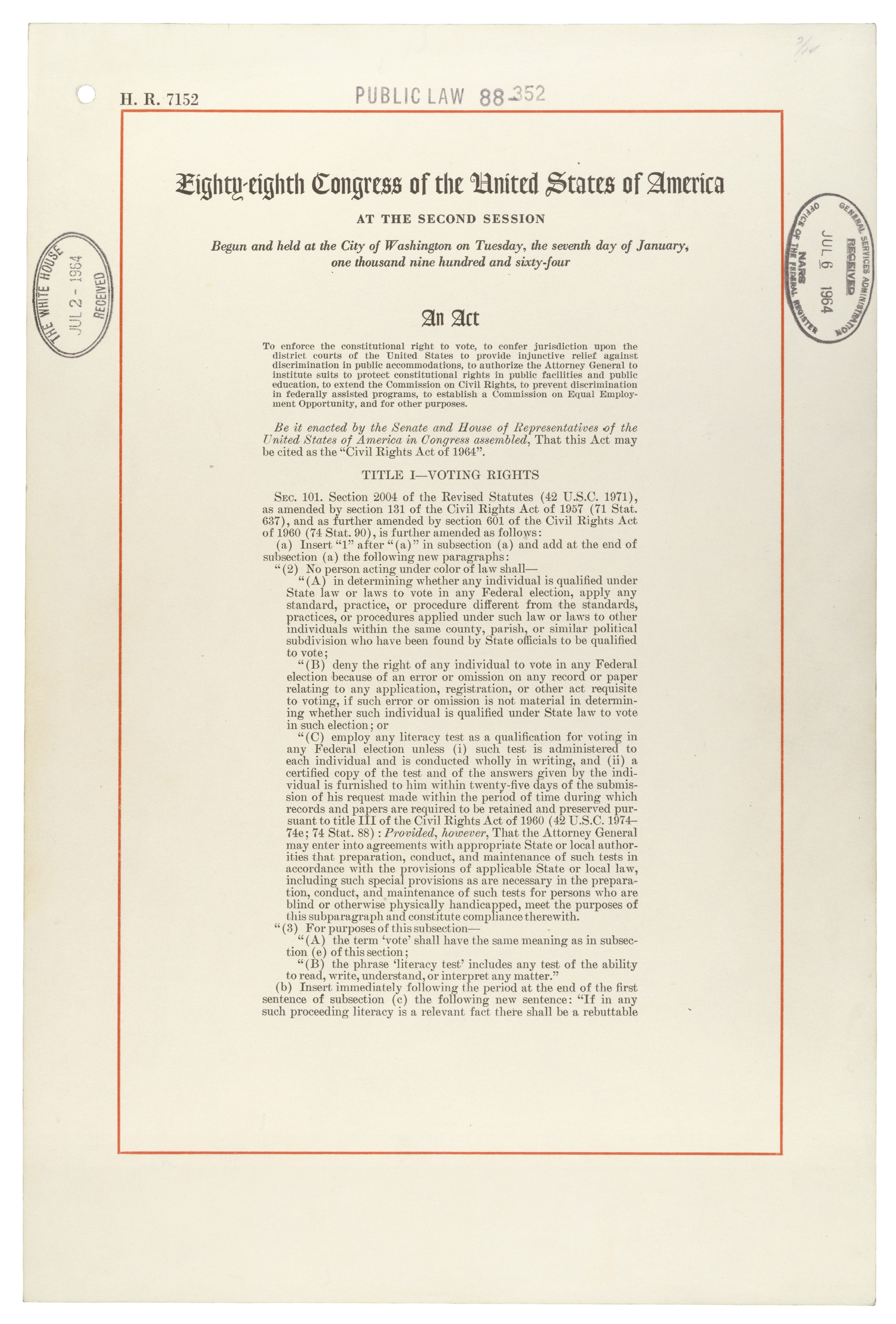
First page of the Civil Rights Act of 1964

Although Goldwater had been successful in rallying conservatives, he was unable to broaden his base of support for the general election. Shortly before the Republican Convention, he had alienated moderate and liberal Republicans by his vote against the Civil Rights Act of 1964, which he opposed due to his opinion that it was unconstitutional, and which Johnson had supported following Kennedy's death and signed into law. Although a staunch supporter of racial equality, having voted in favor of the 1957 and 1960 civil rights bills, and the 24th Amendment to the Constitution, Goldwater felt that desegregation was primarily a states' rights issue, rather than a national policy. He thus believed the 1964 act to be unconstitutional. Goldwater's vote against the legislation helped lead African-Americans to overwhelmingly support Johnson.

Goldwater was also hurt by the reluctance of many prominent moderate Republicans to support him. Governors Nelson Rockefeller of New York and George W. Romney of Michigan refused to endorse Goldwater due to his stance on civil rights and his proposal to make Social Security voluntary, and did not campaign for him. On the other hand, former Vice President Richard Nixon and Governor William Scranton of Pennsylvania loyally supported the GOP ticket and campaigned for Goldwater, although Nixon did not entirely agree with Goldwater's political stances and said that it would "be a tragedy" if Goldwater's platform were not "challenged and repudiated" by the Republicans. Scranton also felt that Goldwater's proposal of voluntarizing Social Security was the "worst kind of fiscal responsibility". The New York Herald-Tribune, a voice for eastern Republicans (and a target for Goldwater activists during the primaries), supported Johnson in the general election. Some moderates even formed a "Republicans for Johnson" organization, although most prominent GOP politicians avoided being associated with it. Republican discontent with Goldwater was the focus of the Johnson campaign's advertisement "Confessions of a Republican".

Fact magazine published an article polling psychiatrists around the country as to Goldwater's sanity. Some 1,189 psychiatrists appeared to agree that Goldwater was "emotionally unstable" and unfit for office, though none of the members had actually interviewed him. The article received heavy publicity and resulted in a change to the ethics guidelines of the American Psychiatric Association, now known as the Goldwater rule. In a libel suit, a federal court awarded Goldwater $1 in compensatory damages, and $75,000 in punitive damages.

Eisenhower's strong backing could have been an asset to the Goldwater campaign, but instead, its absence was clearly noticed. When questioned about the presidential capabilities of the former president's younger brother, university administrator Milton S. Eisenhower, in July 1964, Goldwater replied: "One Eisenhower in a generation is enough." However, Eisenhower did not openly repudiate Goldwater, and made one television commercial for Goldwater's campaign. A prominent Hollywood celebrity who vigorously supported Goldwater was Ronald Reagan. Reagan gave a well-received televised speech supporting Goldwater; it was so popular that Goldwater's advisors had it played on local television stations around the nation. Many historians consider this speech — "A Time for Choosing" — to mark the beginning of Reagan's transformation from an actor to a political leader. In 1966, Reagan would be elected Governor of California.

Goldwater did not have ties to the Ku Klux Klan (KKK), but he was publicly endorsed by members of the organization. Lyndon B. Johnson exploited this association during the elections, but Goldwater barred the KKK from supporting him and denounced them.

==== Goldwater's gaffes ====
Goldwater often spoke off-the-cuff, and many of his unplanned statements were given wide publicity by the Democrats. In the early 1960s, Goldwater had called the Eisenhower administration "a dime store New Deal".

In December 1961, he told a news conference that "sometimes, I think this country would be better off if we could just saw off the Eastern Seaboard and let it float out to sea", a remark which indicated his dislike of the liberal economic and social policies that were often associated with that part of the nation. That comment came back to hurt him, in the form of a Johnson television commercial, as did remarks about making Social Security voluntary (something that even his running mate Miller felt would lead to the destruction of the system) and selling the Tennessee Valley Authority. In a widely publicised verbal gaffe, Goldwater once joked that the U.S. military should "lob one [a nuclear bomb] into the men's room of the Kremlin" in the Soviet Union.

==== Gulf of Tonkin Incident and Resolution ====
Meanwhile, President Johnson was concerned he could lose the election by appearing soft on Communism. On July 10, the USS Maddox was ordered into the Gulf of Tonkin, authorized to "maintain contact with the U.S. military command in Saigon ... and arrange 'such communications ... as may be desired'". On July 30, South Vietnamese commandos tried to attack the North Vietnamese radar station on the island of Hon Me, with the USS Maddox sufficiently close that the North Vietnamese believed it was there to provide cover for that commando raid. North Vietnam filed an official complaint with the International Control Commission, accusing the United States of being behind the raid. On August 2, the Maddox reported having been attacked by three North Vietnamese Navy torpedo boats. Johnson called Soviet Premier Khrushchev, saying the US did not want war and asking the Soviets to convince North Vietnam to not attack American warships. The next day, August 3, South Vietnamese raided Cape Vinhson and Cua Ron. That night, in the middle of a thunderstorm, the Maddox intercepted radio messages that gave them "the 'impression' that Communist patrol boats were bracing for [another] assault". They called for air support from the USS Ticonderoga. The pilots didn't see anything, but the Maddox and the nearby USS Turner Joy started shooting in all directions. However, after the incident, all US personnel involved acknowledged they had neither seen nor heard Communist gunfire. Nevertheless, Johnson and an aide Kenneth O'Donnell agreed that Johnson "would have to respond firmly to defend himself against Goldwater and the Republican right wing". Johnson denounced the attack as "unprovoked" and Congress passed the Gulf of Tonkin Resolution, giving the president the power to do effectively whatever they felt necessary in Vietnam and began major US involvement in the Vietnam War, and left Goldwater looking like an irresponsible hawk.

=== Ads and slogans ===
Full "Daisy" advertisement

Johnson positioned himself as a moderate, and succeeded in portraying Goldwater as an extremist. CIA Director William Colby asserted that Tracy Barnes instructed the CIA to spy on the Goldwater campaign and the Republican National Committee, to provide information to Johnson's campaign; E. Howard Hunt, later implicated as a ringleader in the Watergate scandal, disputed this, instead claiming the operation had been ordered by the White House. In his memoir Goldwater reported that during his 1964 campaign "our telephones had been bugged" and "our security had been penetrated. The opposition appeared to possess some of the details of our plans and strategies the minute a decision was made".

Goldwater had a habit of making blunt statements about war, nuclear weapons, and economics that could be turned against him. The Johnson campaign exploited this, broadcasting a television commercial on September 7 dubbed the "Daisy Girl" ad, which featured a little girl picking petals from a daisy in a field, counting the petals, which then segues into a launch countdown and a nuclear explosion. The ads were in response to Goldwater's advocacy of "tactical" nuclear weapons use in Vietnam. "Confessions of a Republican", another Johnson ad, features a monologue from a man who tells viewers that he had previously voted for Eisenhower and Nixon, but now worries about the "men with strange ideas", "weird groups", and "the head of the Ku Klux Klan" who were supporting Goldwater; he concludes that "either they're not Republicans, or I'm not". Voters increasingly viewed Goldwater as a right-wing fringe candidate. His slogan, "In your heart, you know he's right", was parodied by the Johnson campaign into, "In your guts, you know he's nuts", or, "In your heart, you know he might" (as in "he might push the nuclear button"), or even, "In your heart, he's too far right".

The Johnson campaign's greatest concern may have been voter complacency leading to low turnout in key states. To counter this, all of Johnson's broadcast ads concluded with the line: "Vote for President Johnson on November 3. The stakes are too high for you to stay home." The Democratic campaign used two other slogans: "All the way with LBJ"; and, "LBJ for the USA".

The election campaign was disrupted for a week by the death of former president Herbert Hoover on October 20, 1964, because it was considered disrespectful to be campaigning during a time of mourning. Hoover died of natural causes. He had been U.S. president from 1929 to 1933. Both major candidates attended his funeral.

Johnson led in all opinion polls by huge margins throughout the entire campaign.

== Results ==
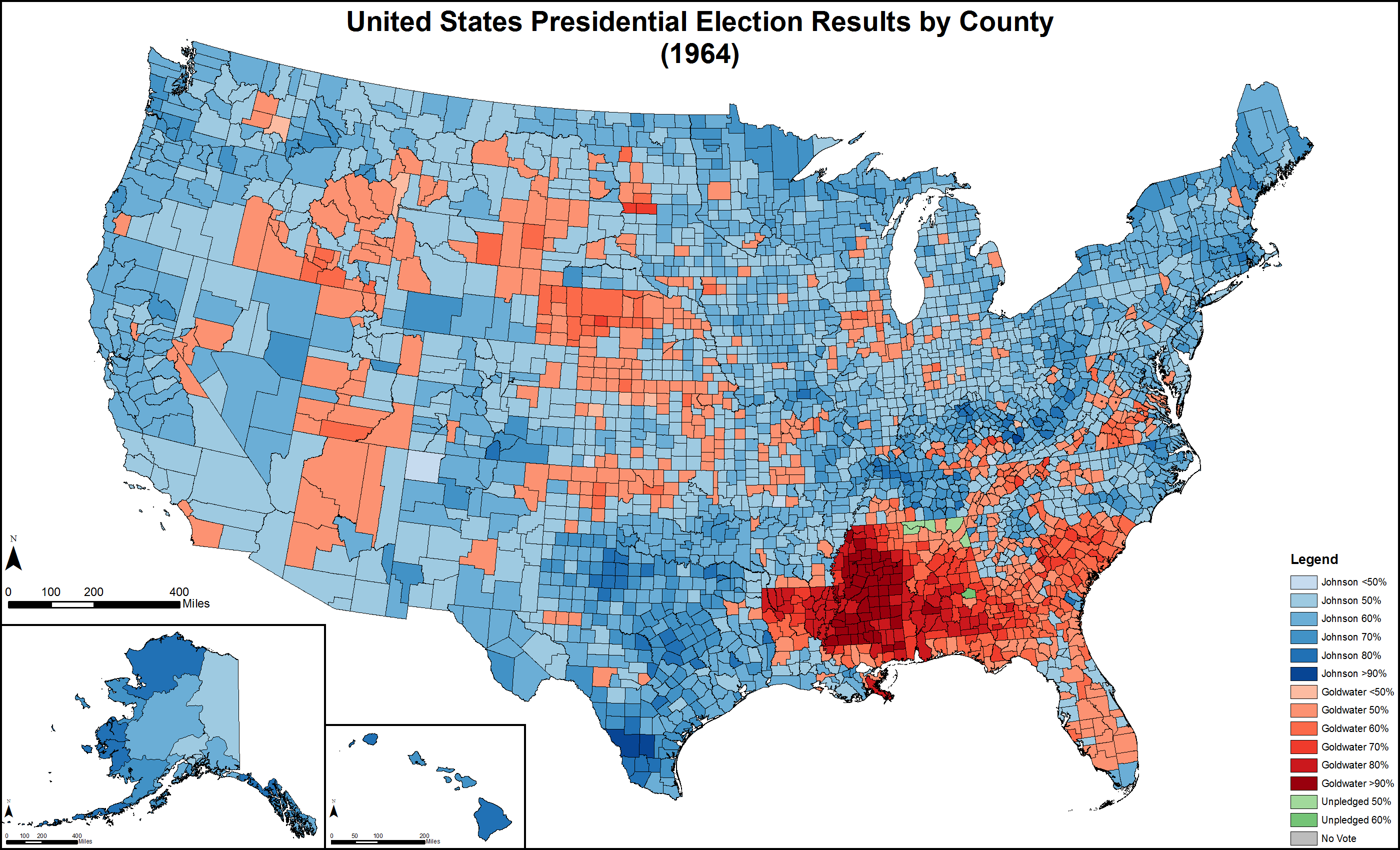
Election results by county. Lyndon B. Johnson Barry Goldwater Unpledged electors

The election was held on November 3, 1964. Johnson beat Goldwater in the general election, winning over 61% of the popular vote. In the end, Goldwater won only his native state of Arizona and five Deep South states — Louisiana, Mississippi, Georgia, Alabama, and South Carolina — which had been increasingly alienated by Democratic civil rights policies, and where Jim Crow laws tended to be still active to varying degrees, before the following year's Voting Rights Act outlawed them entirely.

The five Southern states that voted for Goldwater swung over dramatically to support him. For instance, in Mississippi, where Democrat Franklin D. Roosevelt had won 97% of the popular vote in 1936, Goldwater won 87% of the vote. Of these states, Louisiana had been the only state where a Republican had won even once since Reconstruction, in 1956. Georgia had never voted Republican before this election, South Carolina last did so in 1876, and Mississippi and Alabama last did so in 1872.

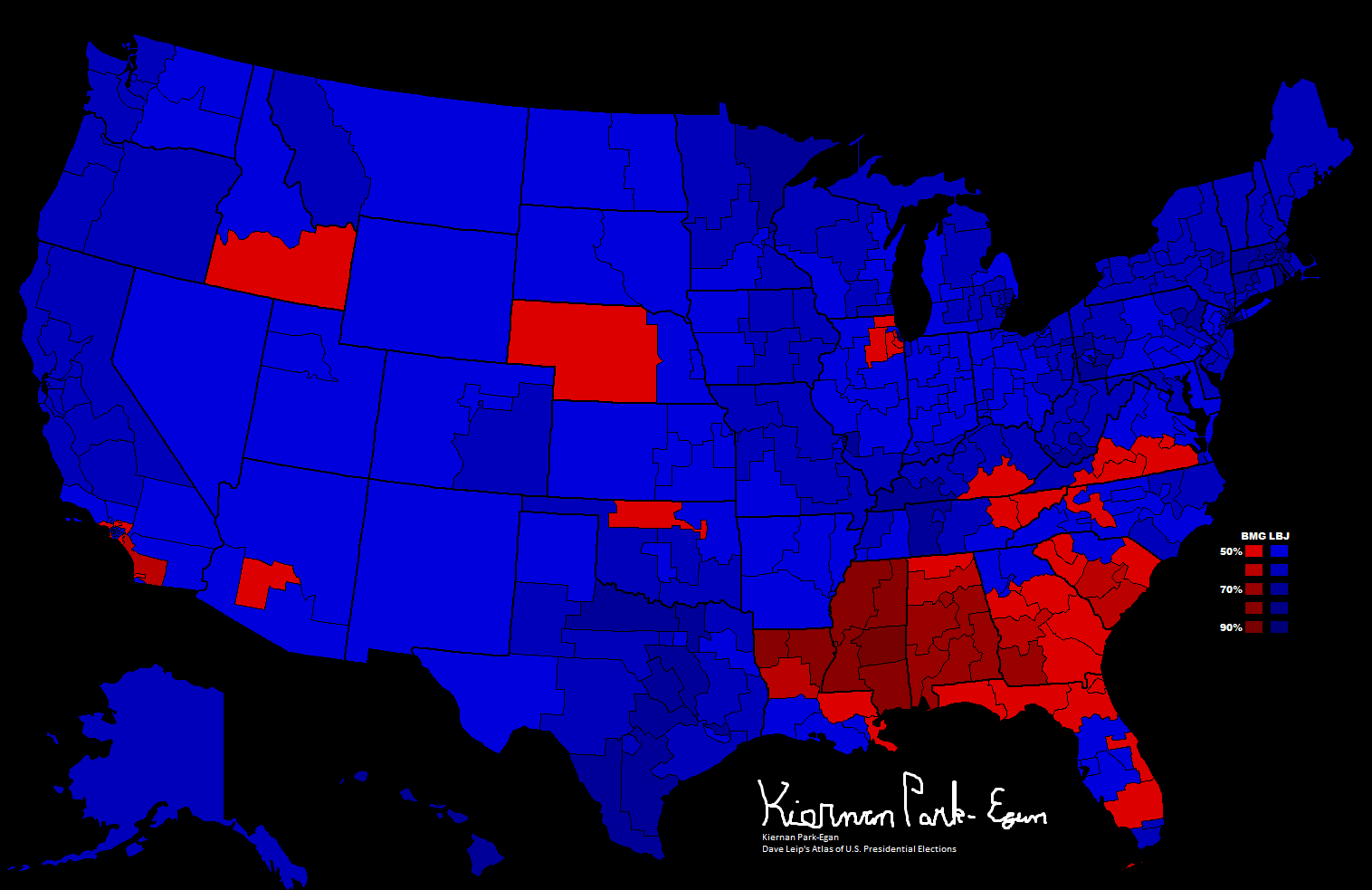
Results by congressional district.

The 1964 election was a major transition point for the South, and an important step in the process by which the Democrats' former "Solid South" became a Republican bastion. Nonetheless, Johnson still managed to eke out a bare popular majority of 51–49% (6.307 to 5.993 million) in the eleven former Confederate states. Conversely, Johnson was the first Democrat ever to carry the state of Vermont in a presidential election, and only the second Democrat, after Woodrow Wilson in 1912, when the Republican Party was divided, to carry Maine since the Republican Party was founded in 1854. Maine and Vermont had been the only states that FDR had failed to carry during any of his four successful presidential bids.

Around twenty percent of the people who had voted for Nixon in the 1960 election switched their support to Johnson. Of the 3,126 counties/districts/independent cities making returns, Johnson won in 2,275 (72.77%), while Goldwater carried 826 (26.42%). Unpledged electors carried six counties in Alabama (0.19%). Johnson was the first president whose home state was in the former Confederacy since Zachary Taylor in 1848. Goldwater was the only Republican presidential candidate between 1952 and 1992 to never have served as president.

Johnson's landslide victory coincided with the defeat of many conservative Republican congressmen. The subsequent 89th Congress would pass major legislation such as the Social Security Amendments of 1965 and the Voting Rights Act of 1965. The 1964 election marked the beginning of a major, long-term re-alignment in American politics, as Goldwater's unsuccessful bid significantly influenced the modern conservative movement. The movement of conservatives to the Republican Party continued, culminating in the 1980 presidential victory of Ronald Reagan.

This was the first election to have the participation of the District of Columbia, under the Twenty-third Amendment to the US Constitution from 1961. The Johnson campaign broke two American election records previously held by Franklin Roosevelt: the most Electoral College votes won by a major-party candidate running for the White House for the first time (with 486 to the 472 won by Roosevelt in 1932); and the largest share of the popular vote under the current Democratic/Republican competition (Roosevelt won 60.8% nationwide, Johnson 61.1%). This first-time electoral count was exceeded when Ronald Reagan won 489 votes in 1980.

This was also the last election until 1988 in which the Democrats carried Iowa or Oregon, 1992 in which the Democrats carried California, Colorado, Illinois, Montana, Nevada, New Mexico, New Jersey, New Hampshire, or Vermont, and 2008 in which the Democrats carried Virginia or Indiana. As such, this was the most recent presidential election in which the entire Midwestern region voted Democratic. This is also the only election between 1952 and 1972 in which Richard Nixon did not appear on the Republican ticket.

Electoral results
Presidential candidate	Party	Home state	Popular vote		Electoral vote	Running mate		
Presidential candidate	Party	Home state	Count	Percentage	Electoral vote	Vice-presidential candidate	Home state	Electoral vote
Lyndon B. Johnson (incumbent)	Democratic	Texas	43,129,040	61.05%	486	Hubert Humphrey	Minnesota	486
Barry Goldwater	Republican	Arizona	27,175,754	38.47%	52	William E. Miller	New York	52
(unpledged electors)	Democratic	Alabama	210,732	0.30%	0		Alabama	0
Eric Hass	Socialist Labor	New York	45,189	0.06%	0	Henning A. Blomen	Massachusetts	0
Clifton DeBerry	Socialist Workers	Illinois	32,706	0.05%	0	Ed Shaw	Michigan	0
E. Harold Munn	Prohibition	Michigan	23,267	0.03%	0	Mark R. Shaw	Massachusetts	0
John Kasper	States' Rights	New York	6,953	0.01%	0	J. B. Stoner	Georgia	0
Joseph B. Lightburn	Constitution	West Virginia	5,061	0.01%	0	Theodore Billings	Colorado	0
Other			13,049	0.02%	—	Other		—
Total			70,641,751	100%	538			538
Needed to win					270			270

Popular vote
Johnson	61.05%
Goldwater	38.47%
Others	0.48%

Electoral vote
Johnson	90.33%
Goldwater	9.67%

=== Aftermath ===
Although Goldwater was decisively defeated, some political pundits and historians believe he laid the foundation for the conservative Reagan Revolution to follow. Among them is Rick Perlstein, historian of the American conservative movement, who wrote of Goldwater's defeat: "Here was one time, at least, when history was written by the losers." Ronald Reagan's speech on Goldwater's behalf, grass-roots organization, and the temporary conservative takeover of the Republican Party would all help to bring about the Reagan Revolution of the 1980s.

At the time, voters with college degrees were a Republican-leaning group, while voters without college degrees were a Democratic-leaning group. Educational polarization would not truly begin until 2000.

Johnson used his victory in the 1964 election to launch the Great Society program at home, sign the Voting Rights Act of 1965, and start the War on Poverty. He also escalated the Vietnam War, which eroded his popularity. By 1968, Johnson's popularity had declined, and the Democrats became so split over his candidacy that he withdrew as a candidate. Moreover, his support of civil rights for blacks helped split white Southerners away from Franklin D. Roosevelt's Democratic New Deal Coalition, which would later lead to the phenomenon of the "Reagan Democrat". Of the 14 presidential elections that followed up to 2020, Democrats would win only six times, although in eight of those elections the Democratic candidate received the highest number of popular votes. The election also furthered the shift of the black voting electorate away from the Republican Party, a phenomenon which had begun with the New Deal. Since the 1964 election, Democratic presidential candidates have almost consistently won 80–95% of the black vote in each presidential election.

=== Geography of results ===
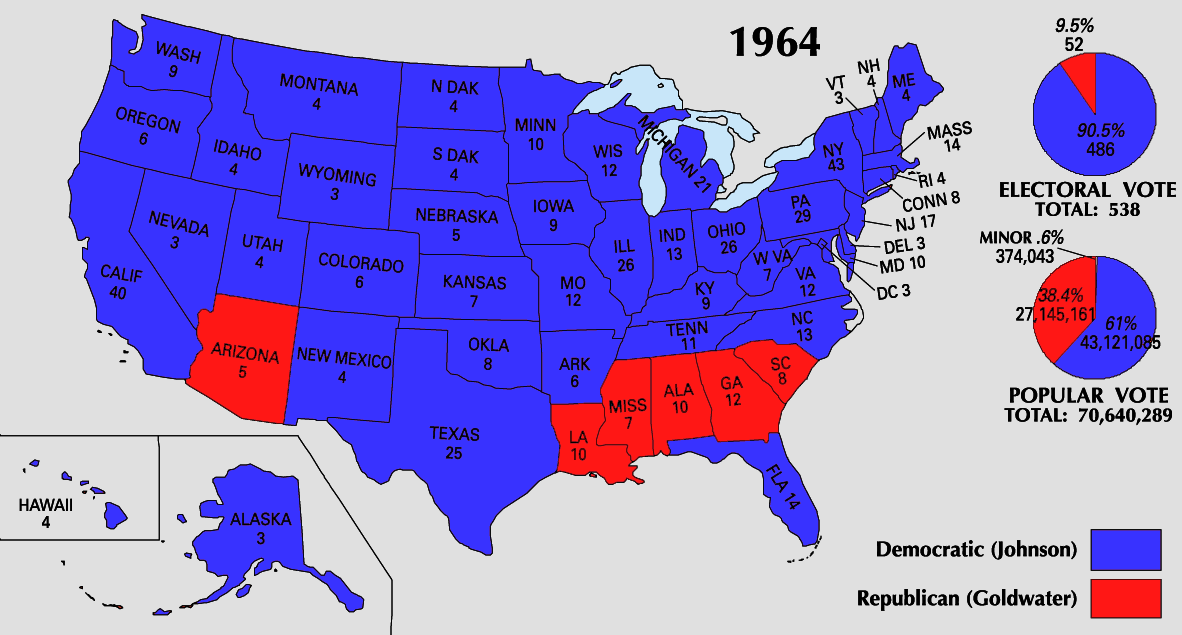
Results by state

Results by county, shaded according to winning candidate's percentage of the vote

Results by district, shaded according to winning candidate's percentage of the vote

==== Cartographic gallery ====
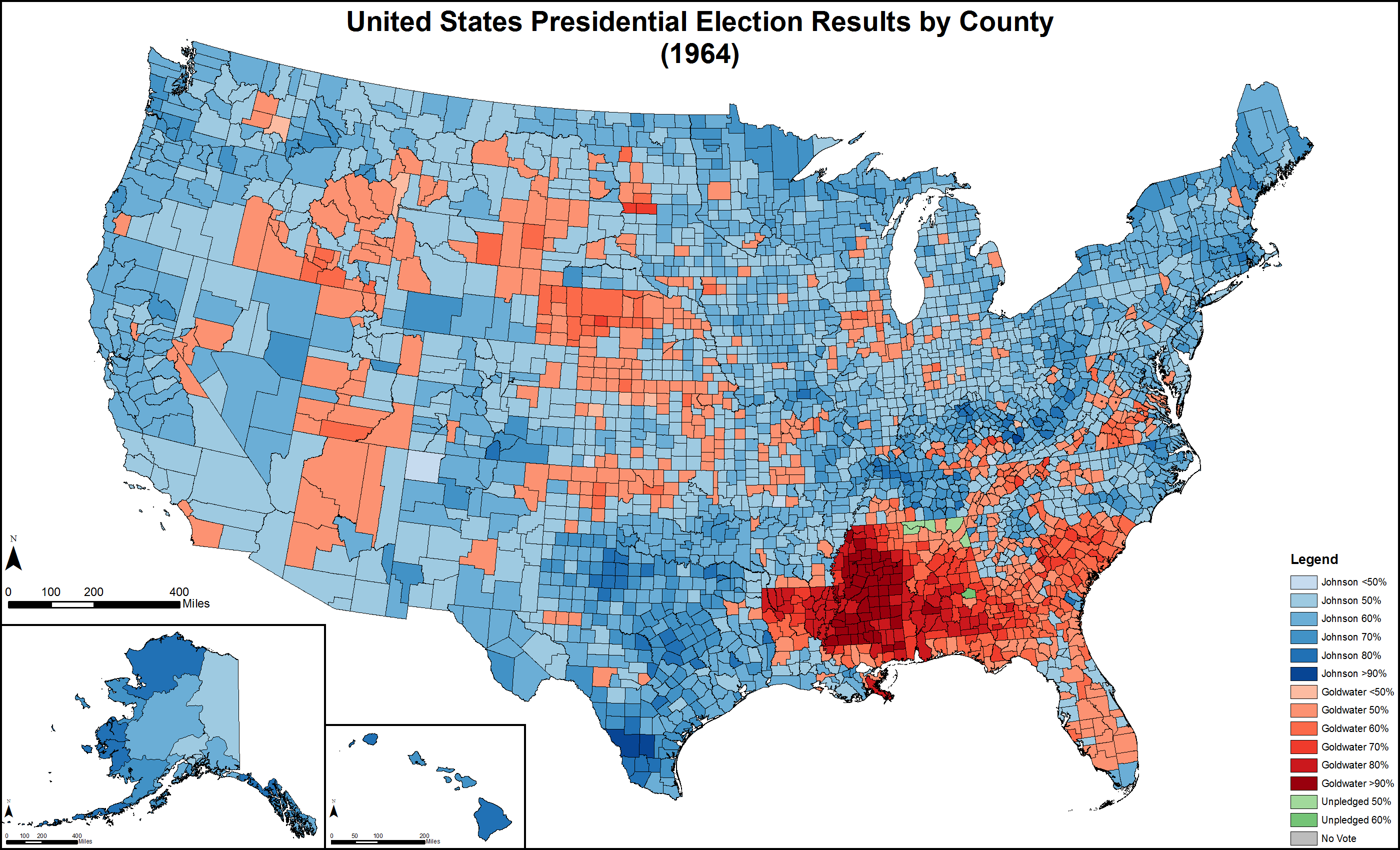
Presidential election results by county

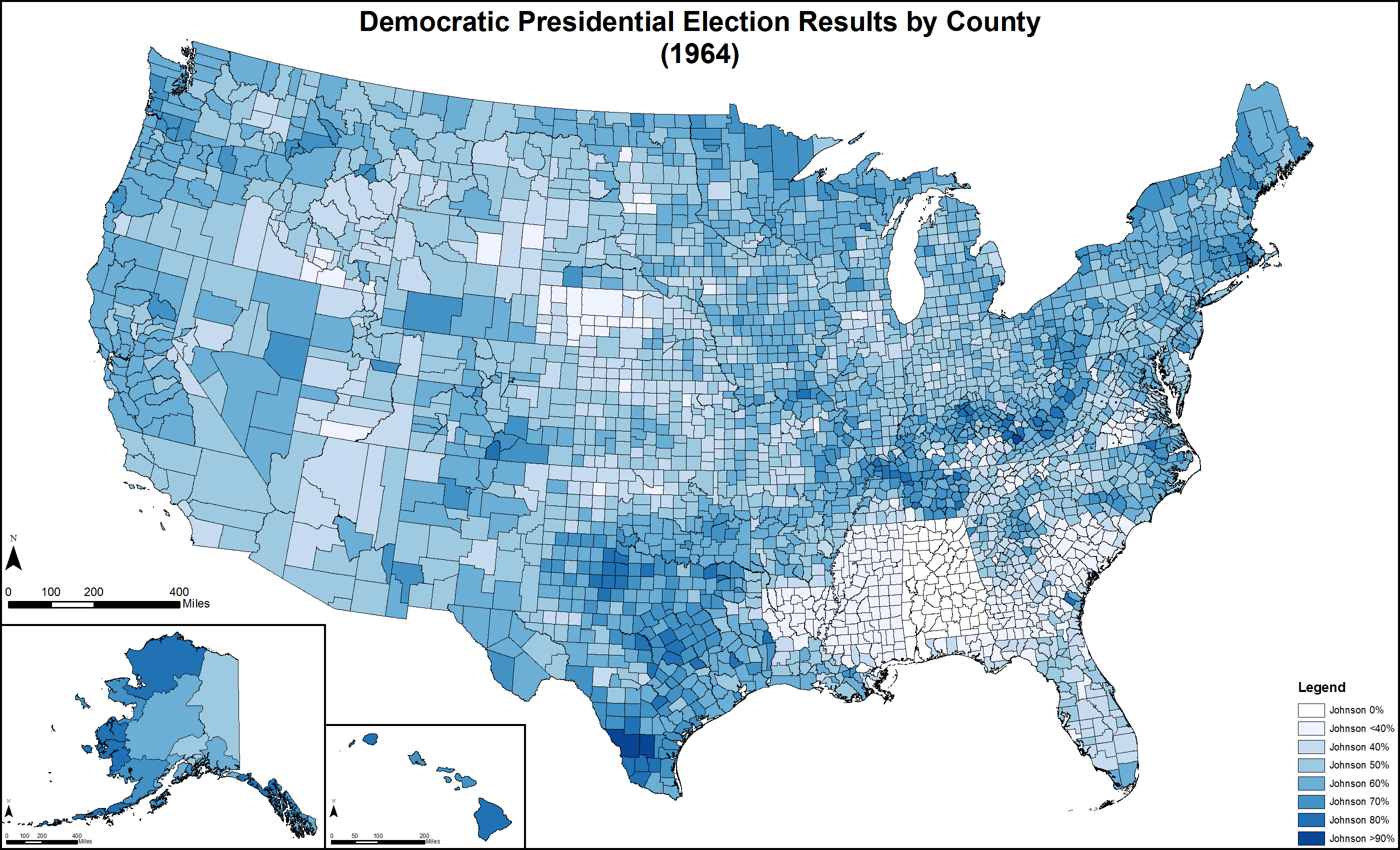
Democratic presidential election results by county

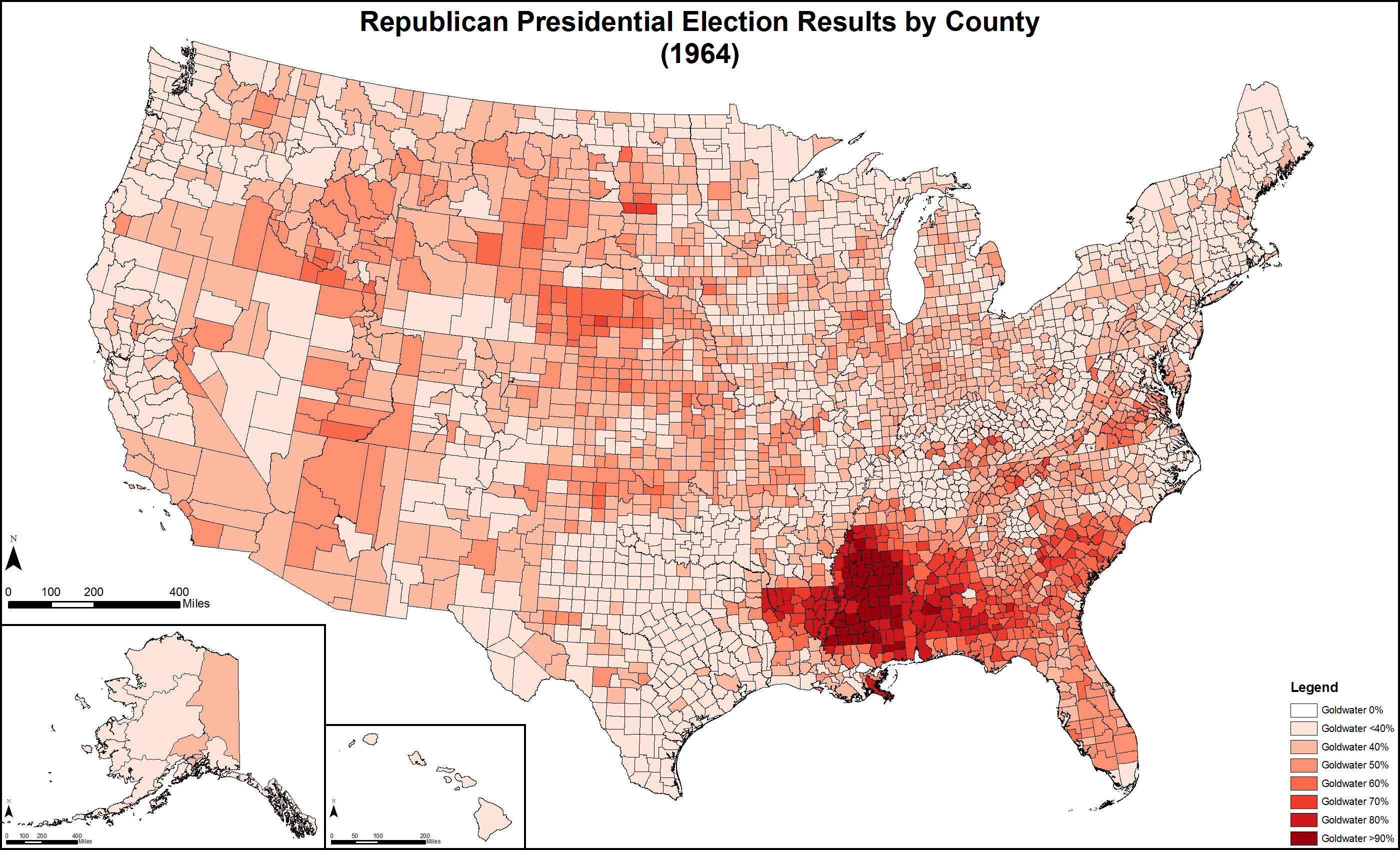
Republican presidential election results by county

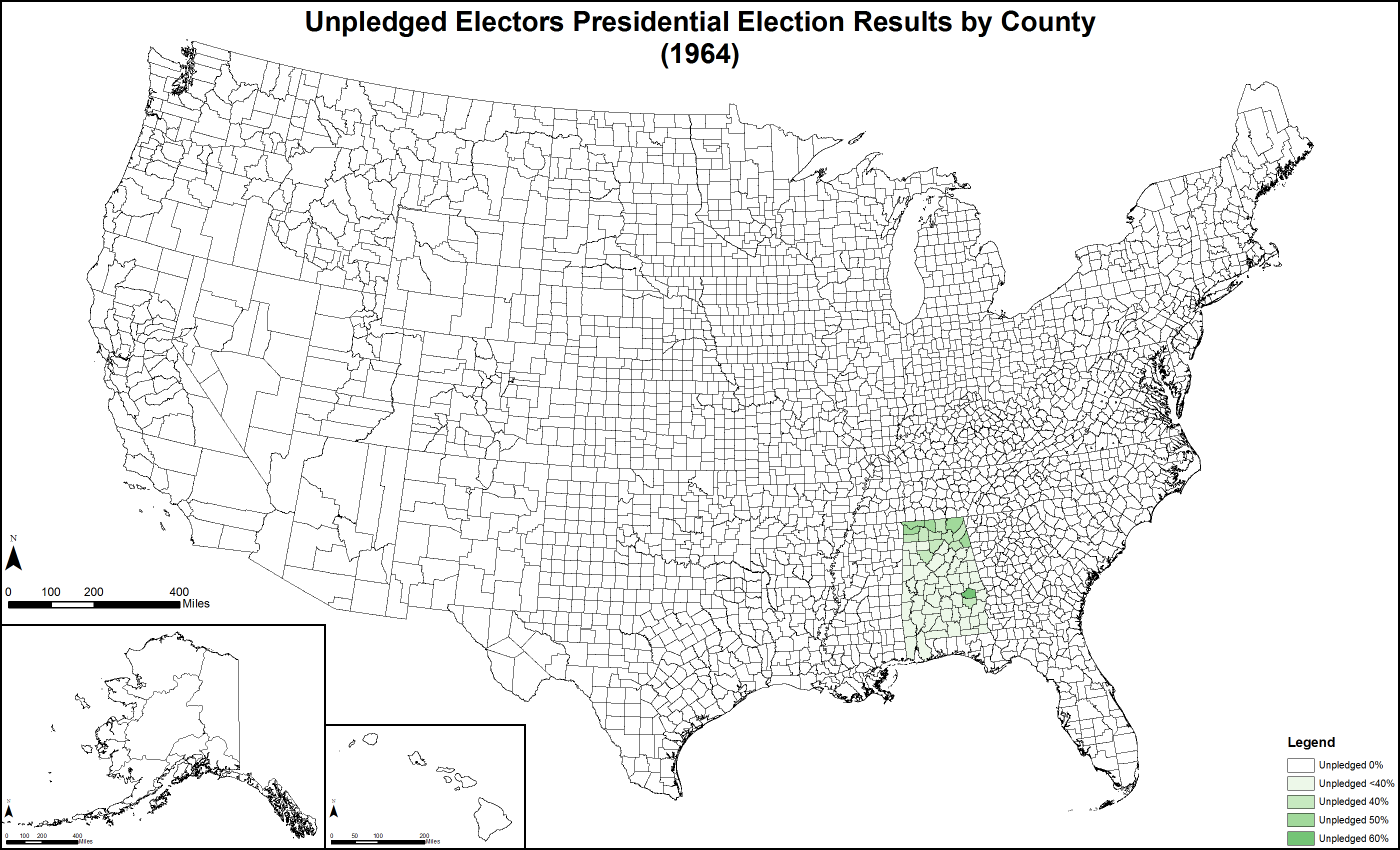
Unpledged electors presidential election results by county

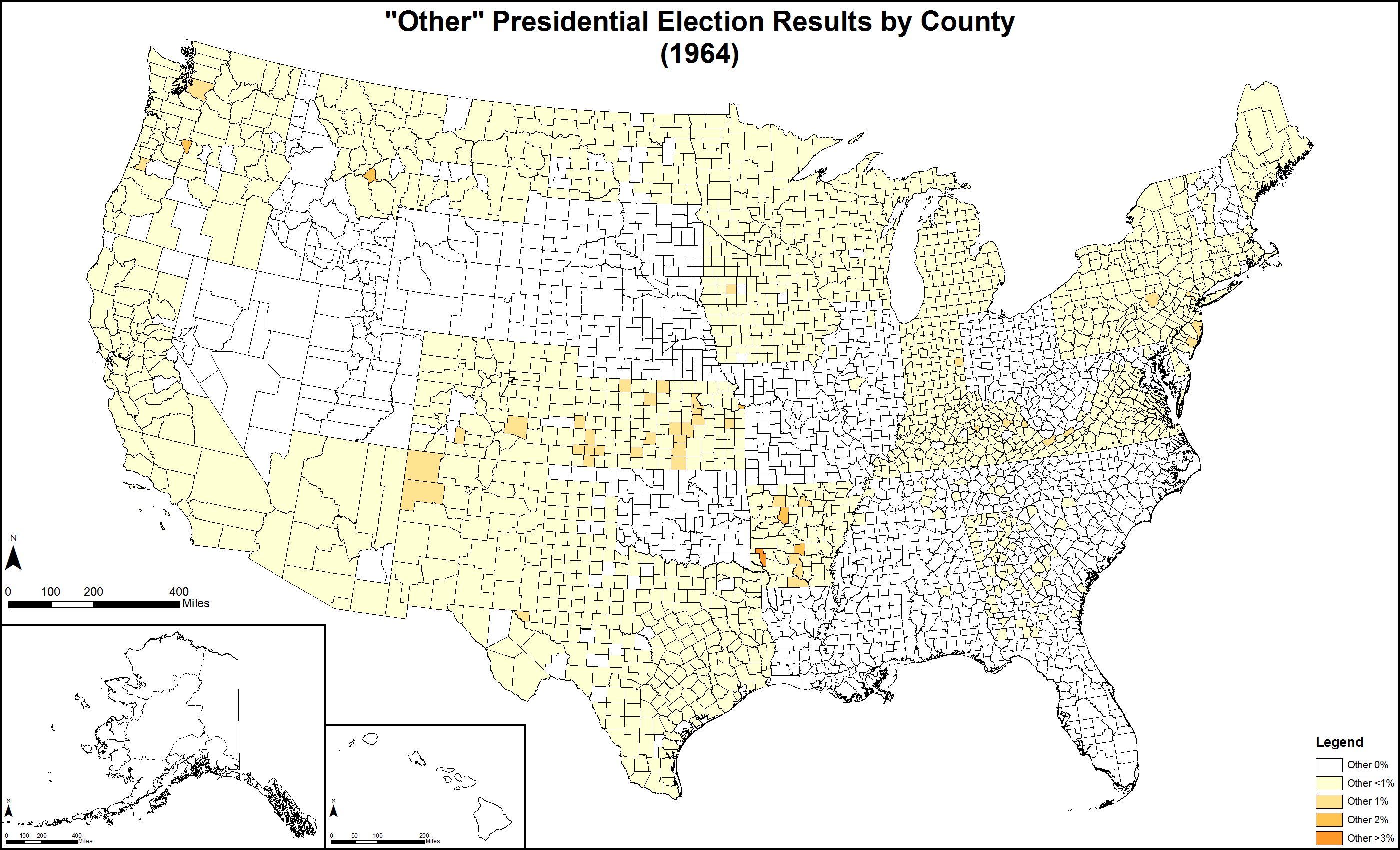
"Other" presidential election results by county

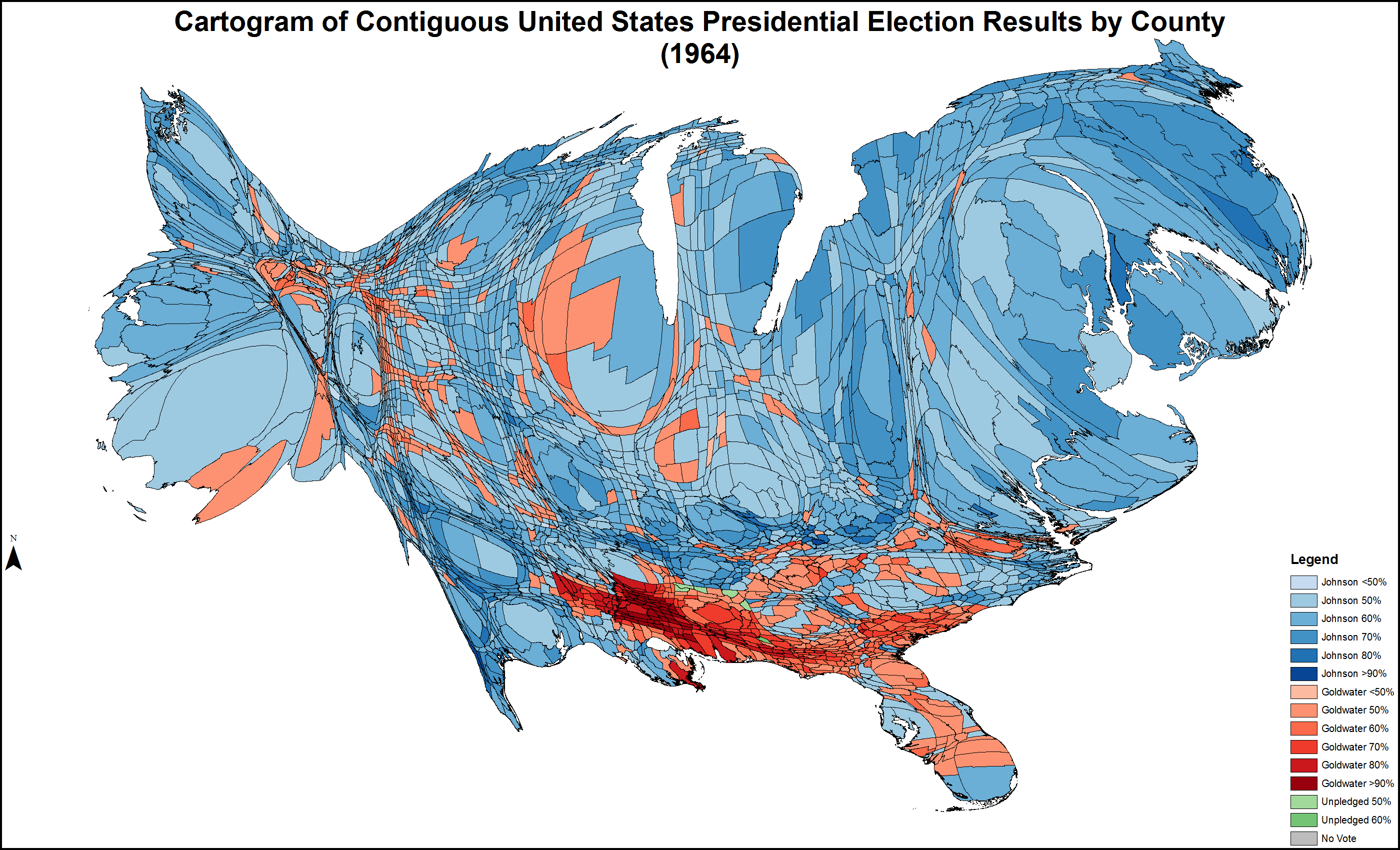
Cartogram of presidential election results by county

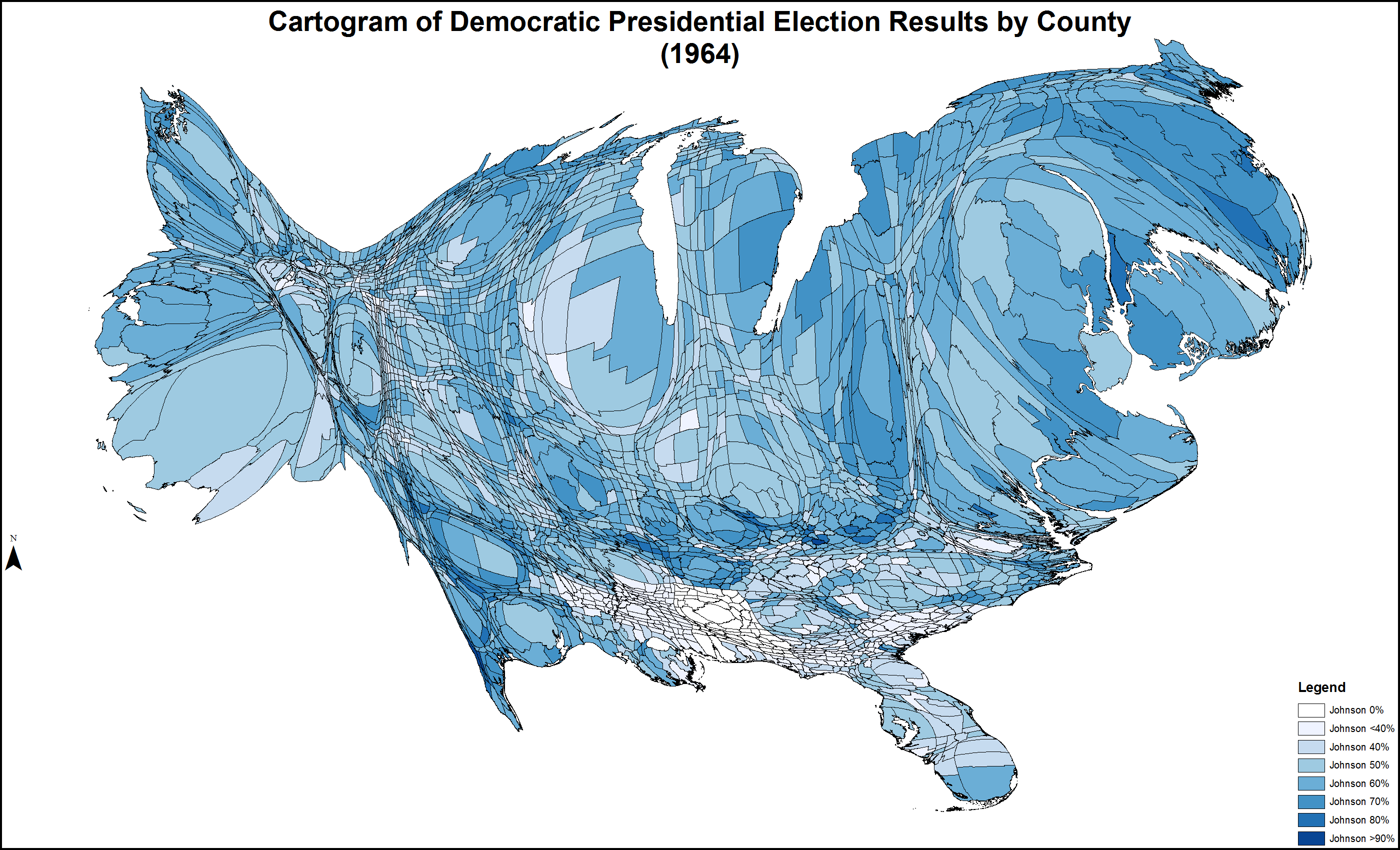
Cartogram of Democratic presidential election results by county

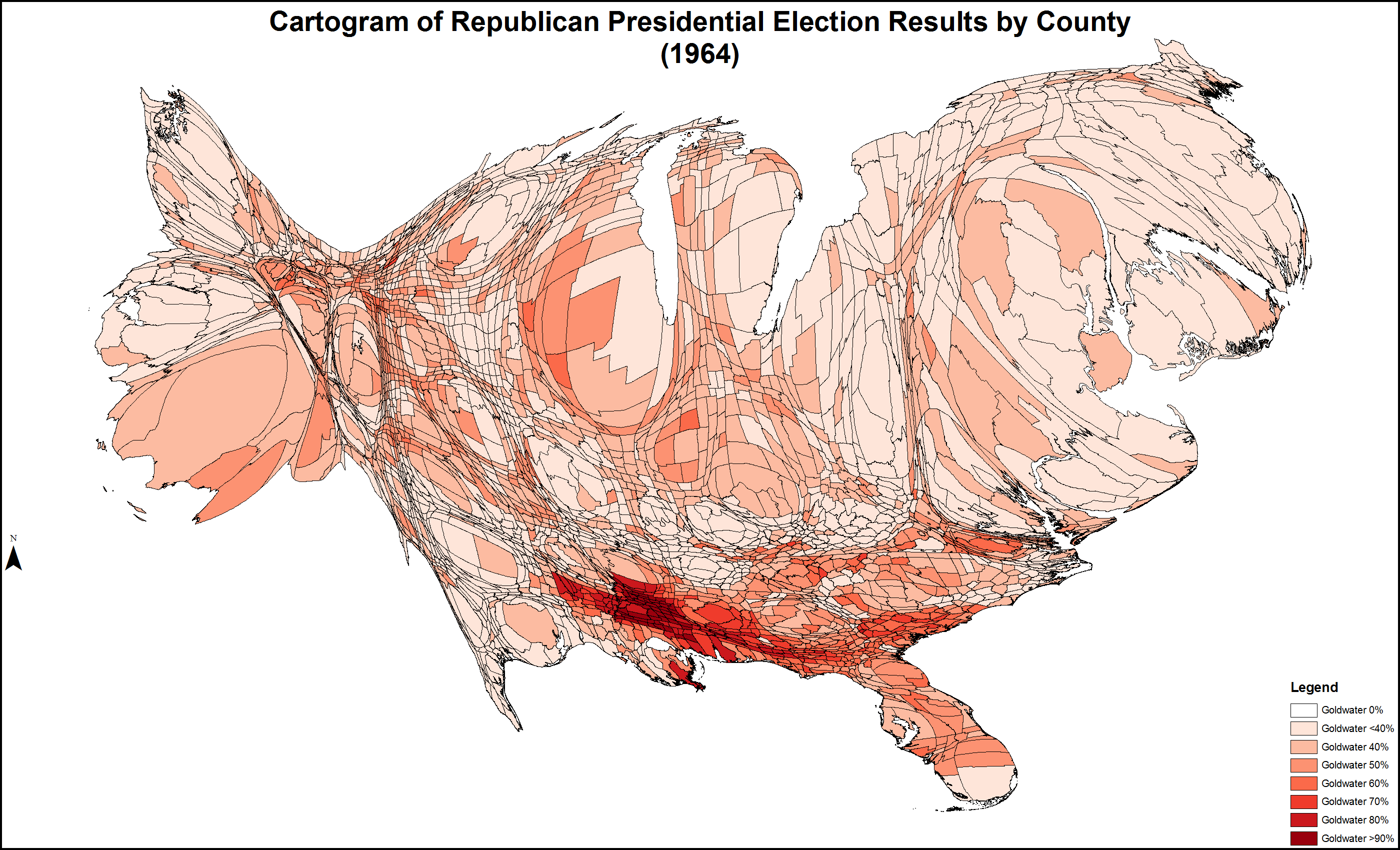
Cartogram of Republican presidential election results by county

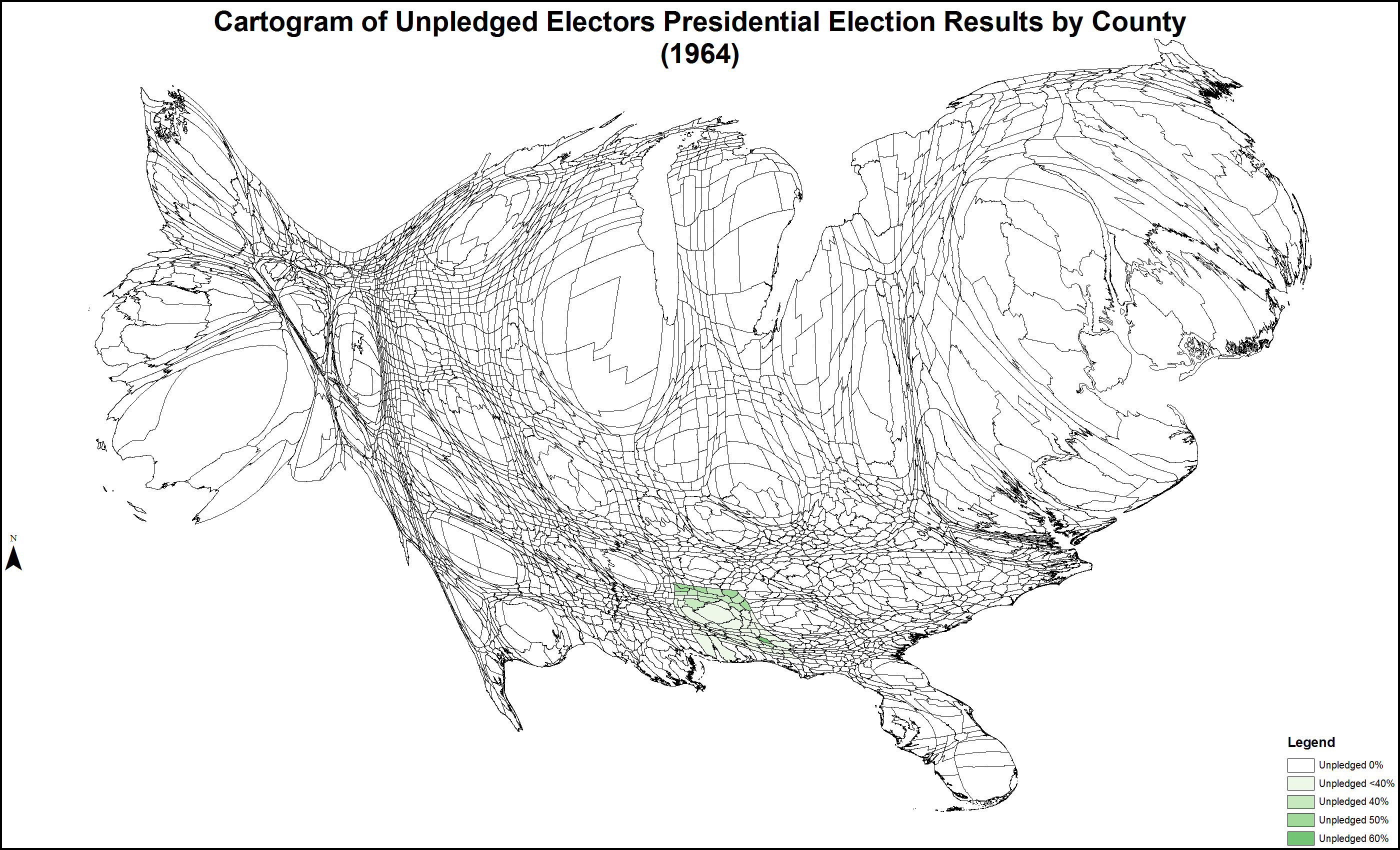
Cartogram of unpledged electors presidential election results by county

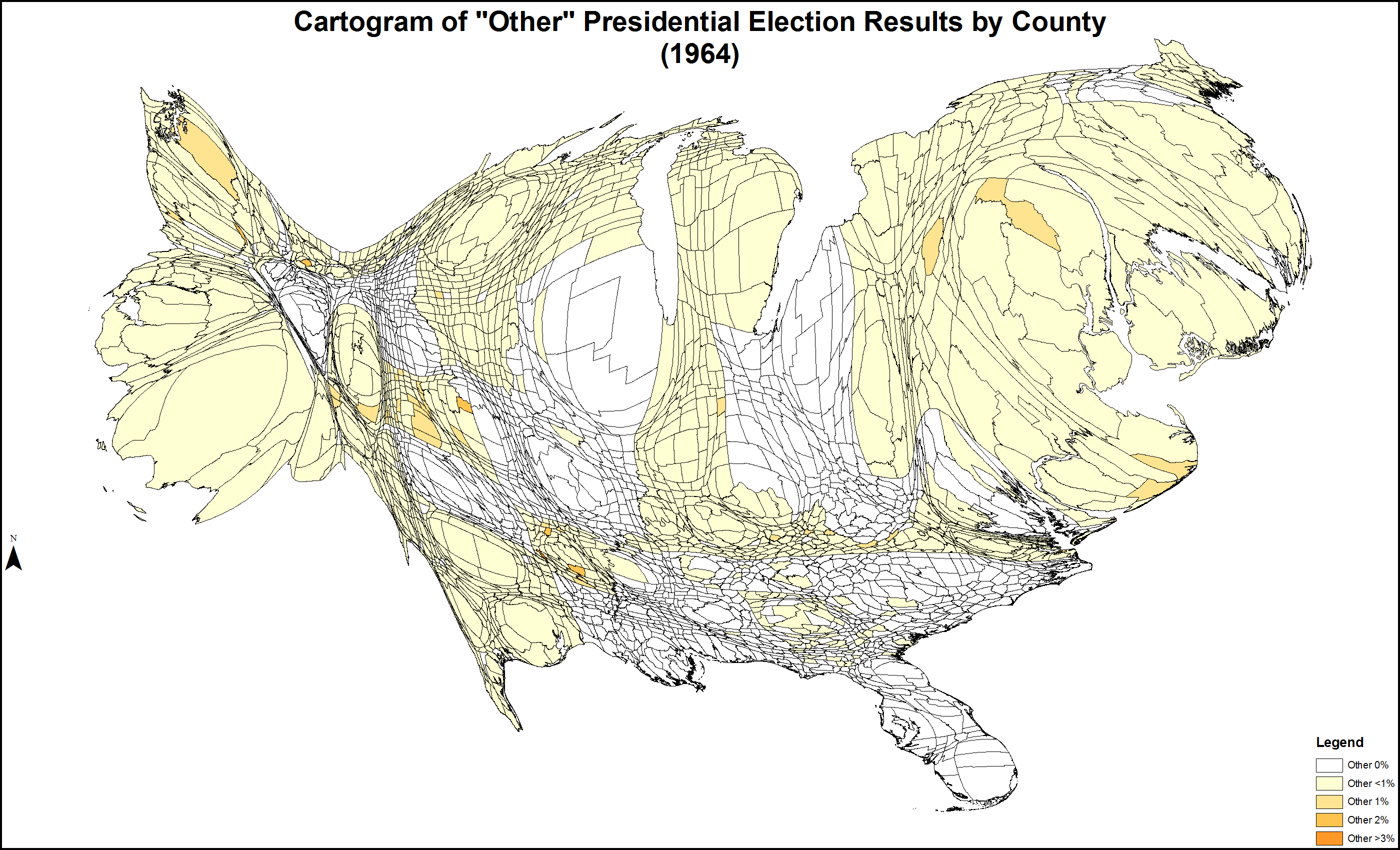
Cartogram of "Other" presidential election results by county

County swing from 1960 to 1964

=== Results by state ===
States/districts won by Johnson/Humphrey
States/districts won by Goldwater/Miller

		Lyndon B. Johnson Democratic			Barry Goldwater Republican			Unpledged electors Unpledged Democratic			Other			Margin		State total	
State	electoral votes	#	%	electoral votes	#	%	electoral votes	#	%	electoral votes	#	%	electoral votes	#	%	#	
Alabama	10	-	-	-	479,085	69.45	10	210,732	30.55	-	-	-	-	−268,353	−38.90	689,817	AL
Alaska	3	44,329	65.91	3	22,930	34.09	-	-	-	-	-	-	-	21,399	31.82	67,259	AK
Arizona	5	237,753	49.45	-	242,535	50.45	5	-	-	-	482	0.10	-	−4,782	−1.00	480,770	AZ
Arkansas	6	314,197	56.06	6	243,264	43.41	-	-	-	-	2,965	0.53	-	70,933	12.66	560,426	AR
California	40	4,171,877	59.11	40	2,879,108	40.79	-	-	-	-	6,601	0.10	-	1,292,769	18.32	7,057,586	CA
Colorado	6	476,024	61.27	6	296,767	38.19	-	-	-	-	4,195	0.54	-	179,257	23.07	776,986	CO
Connecticut	8	826,269	67.81	8	390,996	32.09	-	-	-	-	1,313	0.11	-	435,273	35.72	1,218,578	CT
Delaware	3	122,704	60.95	3	78,078	38.78	-	-	-	-	538	0.27	-	44,626	22.17	201,320	DE
D. C.	3	169,796	85.50	3	28,801	14.50	-	-	-	-	-	-	-	140,995	71.00	198,597	DC
Florida	14	948,540	51.15	14	905,941	48.85	-	-	-	-	-	-	-	42,599	2.30	1,854,481	FL
Georgia	12	522,557	45.87	-	616,584	54.12	12	-	-	-	195	0.02	-	−94,027	−8.25	1,139,336	GA
Hawaii	4	163,249	78.76	4	44,022	21.24	-	-	-	-	-	-	-	119,227	57.52	207,271	HI
Idaho	4	148,920	50.92	4	143,557	49.08	-	-	-	-	-	-	-	5,363	1.83	292,477	ID
Illinois	26	2,796,833	59.47	26	1,905,946	40.53	-	-	-	-	62	0.00	-	890,887	18.94	4,702,841	IL
Indiana	13	1,170,848	55.98	13	911,118	43.56	-	-	-	-	9,640	0.46	-	259,730	12.42	2,091,606	IN
Iowa	9	733,030	61.88	9	449,148	37.92	-	-	-	-	2,361	0.20	-	283,882	23.97	1,184,539	IA
Kansas	7	464,028	54.09	7	386,579	45.06	-	-	-	-	7,294	0.85	-	77,449	9.03	857,901	KS
Kentucky	9	669,659	64.01	9	372,977	35.65	-	-	-	-	3,469	0.33	-	296,682	28.36	1,046,105	KY
Louisiana	10	387,068	43.19	-	509,225	56.81	10	-	-	-	-	-	-	−122,157	−13.63	896,293	LA
Maine	4	262,264	68.84	4	118,701	31.16	-	-	-	-	256	0.07	-	143,563	37.68	381,221	ME
Maryland	10	730,912	65.47	10	385,495	34.53	-	-	-	-	50	0.00	-	345,417	30.94	1,116,457	MD
Massachusetts	14	1,786,422	76.19	14	549,727	23.44	-	-	-	-	8,649	0.37	-	1,236,695	52.74	2,344,798	MA
Michigan	21	2,136,615	66.70	21	1,060,152	33.10	-	-	-	-	6,335	0.20	-	1,076,463	33.61	3,203,102	MI
Minnesota	10	991,117	63.76	10	559,624	36.00	-	-	-	-	3,721	0.24	-	431,493	27.76	1,554,462	MN
Mississippi	7	52,618	12.86	-	356,528	87.14	7	-	-	-	-	-	-	−303,910	−74.28	409,146	MS
Missouri	12	1,164,344	64.05	12	653,535	35.95	-	-	-	-	-	-	-	510,809	28.10	1,817,879	MO
Montana	4	164,246	58.95	4	113,032	40.57	-	-	-	-	1,350	0.48	-	51,214	18.38	278,628	MT
Nebraska	5	307,307	52.61	5	276,847	47.39	-	-	-	-	-	-	-	30,460	5.22	584,154	NE
Nevada	3	79,339	58.58	3	56,094	41.42	-	-	-	-	-	-	-	23,245	17.16	135,433	NV
New Hampshire	4	184,064	63.89	4	104,029	36.11	-	-	-	-	-	-	-	78,036	27.78	288,093	NH
New Jersey	17	1,867,671	65.61	17	963,843	33.86	-	-	-	-	15,256	0.54	-	903,828	31.75	2,846,770	NJ
New Mexico	4	194,017	59.22	4	131,838	40.24	-	-	-	-	1,760	0.54	-	62,179	18.98	327,615	NM
New York	43	4,913,156	68.56	43	2,243,559	31.31	-	-	-	-	9,300	0.13	-	2,669,597	37.25	7,166,015	NY
North Carolina	13	800,139	56.15	13	624,844	43.85	-	-	-	-	-	-	-	175,295	12.30	1,424,983	NC
North Dakota	4	149,784	57.97	4	108,207	41.88	-	-	-	-	398	0.15	-	41,577	16.09	258,389	ND
Ohio	26	2,498,331	62.94	26	1,470,865	37.06	-	-	-	-	-	-	-	1,027,466	25.89	3,969,196	OH
Oklahoma	8	519,834	55.75	8	412,665	44.25	-	-	-	-	-	-	-	107,169	11.49	932,499	OK
Oregon	6	501,017	63.72	6	282,779	35.96	-	-	-	-	2,509	0.32	-	218,238	27.75	786,305	OR
Pennsylvania	29	3,130,954	64.92	29	1,673,657	34.70	-	-	-	-	18,079	0.37	-	1,457,297	30.22	4,822,690	PA
Rhode Island	4	315,463	80.87	4	74,615	19.13	-	-	-	-	13	0.00	-	240,848	61.74	390,091	RI
South Carolina	8	215,700	41.10	-	309,048	58.89	8	-	-	-	8	0.00	-	−93,348	−17.79	524,756	SC
South Dakota	4	163,010	55.61	4	130,108	44.39	-	-	-	-	-	-	-	32,902	11.22	293,118	SD
Tennessee	11	634,947	55.50	11	508,965	44.49	-	-	-	-	34	0.00	-	125,982	11.01	1,143,946	TN
Texas	25	1,663,185	63.32	25	958,566	36.49	-	-	-	-	5,060	0.19	-	704,619	26.82	2,626,811	TX
Utah	4	219,628	54.86	4	180,682	45.14	-	-	-	-	-	-	-	38,946	9.73	400,310	UT
Vermont	3	108,127	66.30	3	54,942	33.69	-	-	-	-	20	0.01	-	53,185	32.61	163,089	VT
Virginia	12	558,038	53.54	12	481,334	46.18	-	-	-	-	3,107	0.30	-	76,704	7.36	1,042,267	VA
Washington	9	779,881	61.97	9	470,366	37.37	-	-	-	-	8,309	0.66	-	309,515	24.59	1,258,556	WA
West Virginia	7	538,087	67.94	7	253,953	32.06	-	-	-	-	-	-	-	284,134	35.87	792,040	WV
Wisconsin	12	1,050,424	62.09	12	638,495	37.74	-	-	-	-	2,896	0.17	-	411,929	24.35	1,691,815	WI
Wyoming	3	80,718	56.56	3	61,998	43.44	-	-	-	-	-	-	-	18,720	13.12	142,716	WY
TOTALS:	538	43,129,040	61.05	486	27,175,754	38.47	52	210,732	0.30	-	336,957	0.48	-	15,951,287	22.58	70,641,751	US

==== States that flipped from Republican to Democratic ====
- Alaska
- California
- Colorado
- Florida
- Idaho
- Indiana
- Iowa
- Kansas
- Kentucky
- Maine
- Montana
- Nebraska
- New Hampshire
- North Dakota
- Ohio
- Oklahoma
- Oregon
- South Dakota
- Tennessee
- Utah
- Virginia
- Vermont
- Washington
- Wisconsin
- Wyoming

==== States that flipped from Democratic to Republican ====
- Georgia
- Louisiana
- South Carolina

==== States that flipped from Unpledged to Republican ====
- Alabama
- Mississippi

==== Close states ====
Margin of victory less than 1% (5 electoral votes):

1. Arizona, 0.99% (4,782 votes)

Margin of victory over 1%, but less than 5% (18 electoral votes):

1. Idaho, 1.83% (5,363 votes)
2. Florida, 2.30% (42,599 votes)

Margin of victory over 5%, but less than 10% (40 electoral votes):

1. Nebraska, 5.22% (30,460 votes)
2. Virginia, 7.36% (76,704 votes)
3. Georgia, 8.25% (94,027 votes)
4. Kansas, 9.03% (77,449 votes)
5. Utah, 9.73% (38,946 votes)

Tipping point:

1. Washington, 24.59% (309,515 votes)

==== Statistics ====
Counties with highest percent of vote (Democratic)

1. Duval County, Texas 92.55%
2. Knott County, Kentucky 90.61%
3. Webb County, Texas 90.08%
4. Jim Hogg County, Texas 89.87%
5. Menominee County, Wisconsin 89.12%

Counties with highest percent of vote (Republican)

1. Holmes County, Mississippi 96.59%
2. Noxubee County, Mississippi 96.59%
3. Amite County, Mississippi 96.38%
4. Leake County, Mississippi 96.23%
5. Franklin County, Mississippi 96.05%

Counties with highest percent of vote (other)

1. Macon County, Alabama 61.54%
2. Limestone County, Alabama 56.01%
3. Jackson County, Alabama 53.53%
4. Lauderdale County, Alabama 52.45%
5. Colbert County, Alabama 51.41%

== Voter demographics ==
The 1964 presidential vote by demographic subgroup
Demographic subgroup	Johnson	Goldwater
Total vote	61	38
Gender
Men	60	40
Women	62	38
Age
18–29 years old	64	36
30–49 years old	61	39
50 and older	59	41
Race
White	59	41
Black	94	6
Religion
Protestants	55	45
Catholics	76	24
Party
Democrats	87	13
Republicans	20	80
Independents	56	44
Education
Less than high school	66	34
High school	62	38
College graduate or higher	52	48
Occupation
Professional and business	54	46
White-collar	57	43
Blue-collar	71	29
Region
Northeast	68	32
Midwest	61	39
South	52	48
West	60	40
Union households
Union	73	27

== See also ==
- Conservatism in the United States
- History of the United States (1964–1980)
- History of the United States Democratic Party
- History of the United States Republican Party
- Second inauguration of Lyndon B. Johnson
- 1964 United States gubernatorial elections
- 1964 United States House of Representatives elections
- 1964 United States Senate elections
- Natural born citizen of the United States (regarding Goldwater's constitutional eligibility to be president)
- Scientists and Engineers for Johnson–Humphrey

== Sources ==
- Karnow, Stanley (1983), Vietnam: A History, Viking Press, OL 1672279W, Wikidata Q108903453
- Moïse, E. Edwin (1996), Tonkin Gulf and the Escalation of the Vietnam War, University of North Carolina Press, OL 23262546M, Wikidata Q108905649
