= 1964 United States presidential election in Tennessee =

- November 3, 1964

Nominee	Lyndon B. Johnson	Barry Goldwater
Party	Democratic	Republican
Home state	Texas	Arizona
Running mate	Hubert Humphrey	William E. Miller
Electoral vote	11	0
Popular vote	634,947	508,965
Percentage	55.50%	44.49%

Johnson
50–60%
60–70%
70–80%
80–90%
Goldwater
50–60%
60–70%
70–80%
President before election
Lyndon B. Johnson
Democratic
Elected President
Lyndon B. Johnson
Democratic

The 1964 United States presidential election in Tennessee took place on November 3, 1964, as part of the 1964 United States presidential election. Tennessee voters chose 11 representatives, or electors, to the Electoral College, who voted for president and vice president.

Incumbent Democratic president Lyndon B. Johnson won Tennessee with 55.50% of the vote to Republican nominee Barry Goldwater's 44.49%. This was the first time Tennessee had voted Democratic for president since 1948.

== Campaign ==
Goldwater supported privatizing the Tennessee Valley Authority, which he considered "a big fat sacred New Deal cow". He received significant criticism for this statement, of which he later wrote that "You would have thought I had just shot Santa Claus". Republican Party of Texas chair Peter O'Donnell, who had chaired the Draft Goldwater Committee and provided financial support to Goldwater's campaign, wrote a memo criticizing Goldwater for "shooting from the hip" and "kicking a sleeping dog".

== Results ==
1964 United States presidential election in Tennessee
Party	Candidate	Votes	%
Democratic	Lyndon B. Johnson (inc.)	634,947	55.50%
Republican	Barry Goldwater	508,965	44.49%
Write-in		34	0.00%
Total votes		1,143,946	100%

=== Results by county ===
County	Lyndon B. Johnson Democratic		Barry Goldwater Republican		Various candidates Write-ins		Margin		Total votes cast
County	#	%	#	%	#	%	#	%	Total votes cast
Anderson	12,146	57.82%	8,860	42.17%	2	0.01%	3,286	15.65%	21,008
Bedford	5,610	71.17%	2,272	28.83%			3,338	42.34%	7,882
Benton	2,611	65.70%	1,363	34.30%			1,248	31.40%	3,974
Bledsoe	1,412	49.67%	1,431	50.33%			−19	−0.67%	2,843
Blount	8,459	41.58%	11,876	58.38%	8	0.04%	−3,417	−16.80%	20,343
Bradley	5,693	45.87%	6,717	54.13%			−1,024	−8.26%	12,410
Campbell	4,412	51.04%	4,232	48.96%			180	2.08%	8,644
Cannon	2,190	74.59%	746	25.41%			1,444	49.18%	2,936
Carroll	4,056	52.07%	3,734	47.93%			322	4.14%	7,790
Carter	5,326	38.60%	8,472	61.40%			−3,146	−22.80%	13,798
Cheatham	2,750	77.38%	803	22.59%	1	0.03%	1,947	54.79%	3,554
Chester	1,763	49.94%	1,767	50.06%			−4	−0.12%	3,530
Claiborne	2,581	47.51%	2,852	52.49%			−271	−4.98%	5,433
Clay	1,196	65.79%	622	34.21%			574	31.58%	1,818
Cocke	2,109	29.32%	5,084	70.68%			−2,975	−41.36%	7,193
Coffee	6,837	69.42%	3,012	30.58%			3,825	38.84%	9,849
Crockett	1,817	49.24%	1,873	50.76%			−56	−1.52%	3,690
Cumberland	3,073	50.81%	2,975	49.19%			98	1.62%	6,048
Davidson	79,387	63.65%	45,335	36.35%			34,052	27.30%	124,722
Decatur	1,813	55.92%	1,429	44.08%			384	11.84%	3,242
DeKalb	2,291	62.04%	1,402	37.96%			889	24.08%	3,693
Dickson	4,724	78.67%	1,281	21.33%			3,443	57.34%	6,005
Dyer	4,717	51.08%	4,517	48.91%	1	0.01%	200	2.17%	9,235
Fayette	2,636	47.43%	2,922	52.57%			−286	−5.14%	5,558
Fentress	1,550	44.05%	1,969	55.95%			−419	−11.90%	3,519
Franklin	6,029	72.72%	2,262	27.28%			3,767	45.44%	8,291
Gibson	8,119	63.76%	4,614	36.24%			3,505	27.52%	12,733
Giles	4,940	78.19%	1,378	21.81%			3,562	56.38%	6,318
Grainger	1,309	33.20%	2,634	66.80%			−1,325	−33.60%	3,943
Greene	5,916	46.11%	6,913	53.89%			−997	−7.78%	12,829
Grundy	2,775	80.18%	686	19.82%			2,089	60.36%	3,461
Hamblen	4,607	47.00%	5,196	53.00%			−589	−6.00%	9,803
Hamilton	38,546	48.95%	40,200	51.05%			−1,654	−2.10%	78,746
Hancock	687	31.17%	1,517	68.83%			−830	−37.66%	2,204
Hardeman	2,675	52.20%	2,450	47.80%			225	4.40%	5,125
Hardin	2,620	46.41%	3,025	53.59%			−405	−7.18%	5,645
Hawkins	4,191	42.32%	5,712	57.68%			-1,521	-15.36%	9,903
Haywood	2,290	48.75%	2,407	51.25%			−117	−2.50%	4,697
Henderson	1,955	38.42%	3,133	61.58%			−1,178	−23.16%	5,088
Henry	5,874	72.21%	2,261	27.79%			3,613	44.42%	8,135
Hickman	2,877	73.84%	1,019	26.16%			1,858	47.68%	3,896
Houston	1,572	84.56%	287	15.44%			1,285	69.12%	1,859
Humphreys	3,230	77.91%	916	22.09%			2,314	55.82%	4,146
Jackson	2,291	80.61%	551	19.39%			1,740	61.22%	2,842
Jefferson	2,600	34.56%	4,923	65.44%			−2,323	−30.88%	7,523
Johnson	927	24.29%	2,889	75.71%			−1,962	−51.42%	3,816
Knox	42,463	49.80%	42,797	50.20%			−334	−0.40%	85,260
Lake	1,667	69.34%	736	30.62%	1	0.04%	931	38.72%	2,404
Lauderdale	3,847	67.17%	1,880	32.83%			1,967	34.34%	5,727
Lawrence	5,449	54.28%	4,590	45.72%			859	8.56%	10,039
Lewis	2,061	84.16%	388	15.84%			1,673	68.32%	2,449
Lincoln	4,861	73.76%	1,728	26.22%	1	0.02%	3,133	47.54%	6,590
Loudon	3,365	44.72%	4,148	55.13%	11	0.15%	−783	−10.41%	7,524
Macon	1,446	43.92%	1,846	56.08%			−400	−12.16%	3,292
Madison	10,573	49.17%	10,932	50.83%			−359	−1.66%	21,505
Marion	3,775	58.05%	2,728	41.95%			1,047	16.10%	6,503
Marshall	3,989	74.85%	1,340	25.15%			2,649	49.70%	5,329
Maury	7,716	62.62%	4,605	37.37%	1	0.01%	3,111	25.25%	12,322
McMinn	5,207	48.07%	5,624	51.93%			−417	−3.86%	10,831
McNairy	2,994	49.06%	3,109	50.94%			−115	−1.88%	6,103
Meigs	816	49.76%	824	50.24%			−8	−0.48%	1,640
Monroe	4,100	48.53%	4,349	51.47%			−249	−2.94%	8,449
Montgomery	10,178	78.34%	2,814	21.66%			7,364	56.68%	12,992
Moore	1,034	79.66%	264	20.34%			770	59.32%	1,298
Morgan	1,957	51.51%	1,842	48.49%			115	3.02%	3,799
Obion	5,672	66.93%	2,802	33.07%			2,870	33.86%	8,474
Overton	3,258	73.83%	1,155	26.17%			2,103	47.66%	4,413
Perry	1,440	73.69%	514	26.31%			926	47.38%	1,954
Pickett	728	43.78%	935	56.22%			−207	−12.44%	1,663
Polk	2,113	55.63%	1,685	44.37%			428	11.26%	3,798
Putnam	6,309	67.81%	2,993	32.17%	2	0.02%	3,316	35.64%	9,304
Rhea	2,637	49.13%	2,730	50.87%			−93	−1.74%	5,367
Roane	6,108	51.57%	5,735	48.43%			373	3.14%	11,843
Robertson	5,784	76.30%	1,797	23.70%			3,987	52.60%	7,581
Rutherford	9,580	70.09%	4,088	29.91%			5,492	40.18%	13,668
Scott	2,007	45.48%	2,406	54.52%			−399	−9.04%	4,413
Sequatchie	1,162	59.10%	804	40.90%			358	18.20%	1,966
Sevier	2,995	30.51%	6,821	69.49%			−3,826	−38.98%	9,816
Shelby	111,496	52.59%	100,527	47.41%	3	0.00%	10,969	5.18%	212,026
Smith	2,934	73.02%	1,084	26.98%			1,850	46.04%	4,018
Stewart	2,444	84.71%	441	15.29%			2,003	69.42%	2,885
Sullivan	19,496	52.41%	17,703	47.59%			1,793	4.82%	37,199
Sumner	9,102	72.59%	3,437	27.41%			5,665	45.18%	12,539
Tipton	3,821	55.43%	3,073	44.57%			748	10.86%	6,894
Trousdale	1,270	86.10%	205	13.90%			1,065	72.20%	1,475
Unicoi	2,000	42.27%	2,731	57.73%			−731	−15.46%	4,731
Union	1,091	38.13%	1,770	61.87%			−679	−23.74%	2,861
Van Buren	865	74.70%	293	25.30%			572	49.40%	1,158
Warren	5,027	74.12%	1,754	25.86%	1	0.01%	3,273	48.26%	6,782
Washington	10,253	49.14%	10,612	50.86%			−359	−1.72%	20,865
Wayne	1,178	31.94%	2,510	68.06%			−1,332	−36.12%	3,688
Weakley	5,161	65.79%	2,684	34.21%			2,477	31.58%	7,845
White	2,987	71.36%	1,199	28.64%			1,788	42.72%	4,186
Williamson	5,075	65.21%	2,707	34.78%	1	0.01%	2,368	30.43%	7,783
Wilson	6,267	69.84%	2,707	30.16%			3,560	39.68%	8,974
Totals	634,947	55.50%	508,965	44.49%	34	0.00%	125,982	11.01%	1,143,946

==== Counties that flipped from Republican to Democratic ====
- Anderson
- Campbell
- Carroll
- Clay
- Cumberland
- Decatur
- Dyer
- Lawrence
- Morgan
- Polk
- Roane
- Sullivan
- Shelby

==== Counties that flipped from Democratic to Republican ====
- Haywood

== Works cited ==
- Black, Earl; Black, Merle (1992). The Vital South: How Presidents Are Elected. Harvard University Press. ISBN 0674941306.
