= William A. Rusher =

American attorney and journalist (1923–2011)

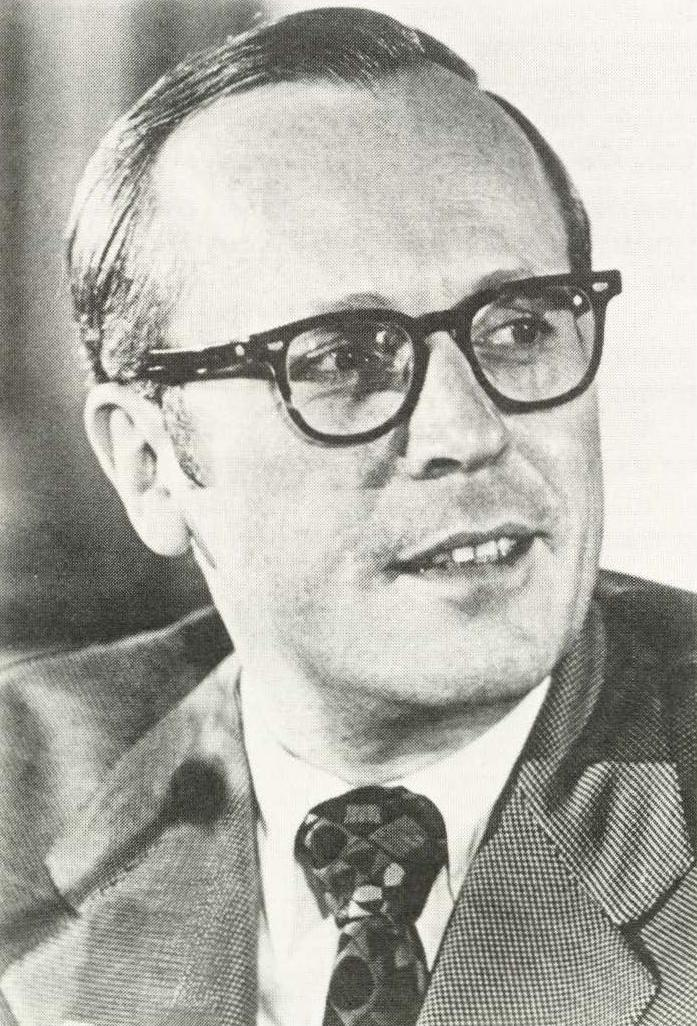
- Rusher in c.1978
- Born: William Allen Rusher; July 19, 1923; Chicago, Illinois, US
- Died: April 16, 2011 (aged 87); San Francisco, California, US
- Education: Princeton University; Harvard Law School
- Occupations: Attorney; Journalist
- Political party: Republican; Campaign strategist for the Draft Goldwater Committee, 1964

William Allen Rusher (July 19, 1923 – April 16, 2011) was an American lawyer, author, activist, and conservative columnist. He was one of the founders of the modern conservative movement and was one of its most prominent spokesmen for thirty years as publisher of National Review magazine, which was edited by William F. Buckley Jr. Historian Geoffrey Kabaservice argues that, "in many ways it was Rusher, not Buckley, who was the founding father of the conservative movement as it currently exists. We have Rusher, not Buckley, to thank for the populist, operationally sophisticated, and occasionally extremist elements that characterize the contemporary movement."

== Early life ==
Rusher was born in Chicago in 1923. His family had not been especially political; his parents were moderate Republicans, and his paternal grandfather had been a socialist. In 1930, the family moved to the New York metropolitan area and lived on Long Island. Rusher entered Princeton University at sixteen and was active in student affairs, especially debate. He majored in political science. After graduation in 1943 and wartime service in the United States Army Air Corps, he attended Harvard Law School, where he founded and led the Harvard Young Republicans and from which he graduated in 1948. Until 1956, Rusher practiced corporate law at Shearman, Sterling & Wright, a Wall Street firm in New York City. He then served as associate counsel to the Senate Internal Security Subcommittee, under chief counsel Robert J. Morris, for seventeen months.

In these years, Rusher was also active in New York state and national Young Republican politics, helping F. Clifton White to lead an alliance in these organizations including the New York Young Republican Club. He came to the attention of William F. Buckley Jr., editor of the fledgling National Review, shortly after its founding in late 1955, when he wrote an essay for the Harvard Young Republican paper, titled "Cult of Doubt."

== National Review and political activism ==
In mid-1957, William F. Buckley Jr. hired Rusher as publisher of National Review. At the magazine, he oversaw the business operations, but more importantly served as a link to the world of conservative and Republican politics. He held the rank although not the title of senior editor and as such was a full participant in its internal deliberations. At National Review, he advocated that the magazine develop and maintain a leadership role in the conservative movement. In doing this, Rusher sometimes disagreed with Buckley and senior editor James Burnham. In his philosophy of conservative politics and his belief in the urgent need for an active and unified movement to pursue conservative politics, he was especially close to another senior editor at the magazine, Frank Meyer.

Rusher was an early mentor of Young Americans for Freedom, founded in Connecticut with his assistance in 1960. He helped to found the Conservative Party of New York State in 1961, and the American Conservative Union in 1964. He was a mentor to young conservative activists from these early years into the 1990s.

In 1961, Rusher worked with Clif White and Congressman John Ashbrook to form the nucleus of what became U.S. Senator Barry M. Goldwater's campaign for the Republican nomination for the presidency in 1964, known as the Draft Goldwater Committee. Goldwater's victory in the bitterly fought nomination contest over New York Governor Nelson A. Rockefeller and the previously dominant moderate or liberal establishment in the Republican Party was the first stage in the rise to national power of the conservative movement. In December 1961, Rusher was a founding member of the American Committee for Aid to Katanga Freedom Fighters, a lobbying group which sought U.S. recognition of Katanga.

In 1966, Rusher together with Max Yergan became co-chairmen of the American-African Affairs Association (AAAA), which lobbied the United States to recognize Rhodesia. A major theme of the publications of the American-African Affairs Association was the black opponents of Rhodesia were controlled by either the Soviet Union or China, and to allow majority rule in Rhodesia would thus allow Communism to be established there. In a letter to the editor of The Nation in 1967, Rusher admitted that an overlap in topics and themes expressed by the AAAA and the Rhodesian Information Office was due to the fact that AAAA shared the same offices at 79 Madison Avenue in New York as the public relations firm of Marvin Liebman Associates, which had been hired by the Information Office to improve Rhodesia's image in America. As a part of his efforts to assist Rhodesia, Rusher introduced Kenneth Towsey, the head of the New York office of the Rhodesian Information Office, to various media personalities where Towsey made his case that Rhodesia, which was often pilloried in the United States for its white supremacist policies, was just being misunderstood by the American media.

Beginning in the late 1950s and continuing well past his retirement from National Review at the end of the 1980s, Rusher was a very active public speaker on college campuses and in other forums, where he defended and advocated the conservative position. In the early 1970s, he was the main conservative representative on a PBS television debate show, The Advocates, which also featured the later governor of Massachusetts, Michael S. Dukakis, the 1988 Democratic presidential nominee. Rusher was also a commentator on ABC-TV's Good Morning America in the late 1970s and a regular radio commentator in the 1980s. Throughout Rusher's career, he was known as an aggressive and exceptionally skilled debater. However, in a 1971 debate, Rusher faced formidable opposition in linguist and prominent anti-war activist MIT professor Noam Chomsky; Rusher repeatedly interrupted Chomsky, who calmly and assertively answered his questions.

In the middle 1970s, Rusher was among the most prominent advocates for a conservative third party, or as he called it "new majority party," that would replace the Republicans; he was also involved heavily in efforts to organize such a party. He repeatedly and unsuccessfully urged Reagan, whom he had known since the late 1960s, to lead this effort and to agree to accept such a party's nomination.

Although he was a "fusionist" conservative who believed in both small-government and socially-conservative positions, Rusher was greatly concerned with unifying the movement and keeping it unified. He believed that Ronald Reagan, whom he promoted as a possible presidential candidate as early as 1967 and in whose reluctant campaign for the Republican nomination in 1968 he had some involvement, was the ideal leader for this purpose. Rusher also believed that the Reagan presidency was the conservatives' greatest political achievement.

In terms of issues, he was heavily motivated by anti-communism throughout his career, was an outspoken opponent of the 1960s counterculture, and took a special interest in what he considered pervasive liberal bias in the news media. As an adult he was baptized and became a Traditional Anglican, although his religious views rarely entered into his political discourse.

In 1976, Rusher together with Marvin Liebman and a former CIA officer, David Atlee Phillips, founded a new pro-Rhodesian lobbying group, the American-Rhodesian Association, whose object was having the U.S. recognize Rhodesia. Despite its public claim to be working independently of Rhodesia, the American-Rhodesian Association worked closely with the Information Office of the Rhodesian government. In 1978, Rusher visited Chile, where he praised the regime of General Augusto Pinochet, saying he was "unable to find a single opponent of the regime in Chile (as distinguished from New York) who believes the Chilean government engages in torture". Rusher also wrote about the status of political prisoners that "about four thousand Allende sympathizers were prosecuted and convicted of specific crimes after the 1973 coup", of which all "but a dozen were sent into exile abroad or were jailed". Finally, he argued that even if the Pinochet regime had violated human rights, it did not matter because the regime was "creating a powerful and truly sinewy Chilean economy" and "sacrifices to this end are very much worth making".

Rusher wrote five books: Special Counsel (1968), a memoir of his time on the Internal Security Subcommittee; The Making of the New Majority Party (1975), in which he advocated the establishment of a new conservative party to replace the Republicans in the post-Watergate period; How to Win Arguments (1981), a primer of debating techniques; The Rise of the Right (1984), a history of the conservative movement from the 1950s to the early 1980s, re-released in 1993 with an appendix covering more recent developments; and The Coming Battle for the Media (1988).

At times, Rusher doubted the GOP could ever be converted to true conservatism, and spent some of his career unsuccessfully trying to jump-start a conservative third party.

== Retirement ==
Rusher retired from National Review at age 65 at the end of 1988. The following year, he moved from New York to San Francisco. In California, Rusher served actively as a distinguished fellow of the Claremont Institute from 1989 onward. He also served as a board member of the conservative California Political Review, and was for many years the chairman of the board of the Media Research Center, an anti-bias organization founded and led by L. Brent Bozell III. In addition, Rusher was involved with the Ashbrook Center for Public Affairs, the Pacific Research Institute, and the Pacific Legal Foundation.

He was in the news during the hearings for the Samuel Alito Supreme Court nomination in 2005, when he allowed Senate staff members to inspect documents related to the Concerned Alumni of Princeton group, in which Alito was tangentially involved, in the Rusher Papers at the Library of Congress. Rusher retired from his newspaper column, which he had written since 1973 under the title "The Conservative Advocate," in February 2009. After more than half a year of ill health, he died in April 2011 in an assisted living home in San Francisco. He never married and had no survivors.

== Publications ==
=== Books ===
- Special Counsel. New Rochelle, NY: Arlington House, 1968.
- How to Win Arguments More Often Than Not. New York: Doubleday, 1981. ISBN 978-0385152556.
- The Rise of the Right. New York: Morrow, 1984. ISBN 978-0688019365.
- The Coming Battle for the Media: Curbing the Power of the Media Elite. New York: Morrow, 1988. ISBN 978-0688064334.

=== Articles ===
- "The Vindication of American Anti-Communism" (Review Essay). Orbis, Vol. 40, No. 4, Autumn 1996, pp. 627–637. doi:10.1016/S0030-4387(96)90023-X.
