= Texas Academy of Medicine, Engineering, Science and Technology =

The Academy of Medicine, Engineering & Science of Texas
- Founded: 2004
- Founder: Michael S. Brown, Kay Bailey Hutchison, Richard Smalley
- Type: Not-for-profit interdisciplinary scientific organization
- Purpose: Strengthen Texas' research community
- Location: Austin, Texas
- Members: 250+
- Website: tamest.org

The Texas Academy of Medicine, Engineering & Science of Technology (TAMEST) is a not-for-profit interdisciplinary scientific organization, whose membership consists of all Texas-based members of the three national academies and other honorific organizations, including eight Nobel laureates. It was renamed from its previous iteration as The Academy of Medicine, Engineering, Science of Texas in 2022.

== Mission ==
TAMEST's mission is "to bring together the state’s brightest minds in medicine, engineering, science and technology to foster collaboration, and to advance research, innovation and business in Texas."

== Membership ==
TAMEST (Texas Academy of Medicine, Engineering, Science and Technology) was co-founded in 2004 by the Honorable Kay Bailey Hutchison and Nobel Laureates Michael S. Brown, M.D., and Richard E. Smalley, Ph.D. With more than 360 members, eight Nobel Laureates and 23 member institutions, TAMEST is composed of the Texas-based members of the three National Academies: the National Academy of Sciences, the National Academy of Engineering, and the National Academy of Medicine and other honorary societies.

The current officers of the Board of Directors can be found on their website.

== Influence ==
TAMEST’s interdisciplinary model is used by research and development centers across Texas for talent recruitment. Since its founding in 2004, more than 350 TAMEST members have either been inducted into the National Academies or have relocated to Texas.

Because of the collective scientific prestige of the organization's members, TAMEST's recommendations are closely watched by policy-makers, both in Texas and nationally.

== The Hill Prizes ==
The Hill Prizes, funded by Lyda Hill Philanthropies, recognize and advance top Texas innovators and researchers whose work could have significant impact on science and society. The prizes propel high-risk, high-reward ideas and innovations that demonstrate significant potential for real-world impact and can lead to new, paradigm-shifting paths in research.

The Hill Prizes have seven categories: artificial intelligence; biological sciences; commercialization, innovation and technology; engineering; medicine; physical sciences; and public health. The Hill Prize in Artificial Intelligence (AI) will be given to researchers and teams at academic and medical institutions, in government, entrepreneurs and companies (including university and government spinout companies). The biological sciences, engineering, medicine, physical sciences and public health prizes will be given to researchers and teams at academic and medical institutions. The Hill Prize in Commercialization, Innovation and Technology — open to both individuals and teams — will be given to entrepreneurs and companies in applied sciences, biotechnology, engineering, life sciences and medicine.

Lyda Hill Philanthropies has committed over $10 million in funding to continue the prize program and include at least $1 million in discretionary research funding allocated by Lyda Hill Philanthropies on an ad hoc basis to highly ranked applicants and finalists not selected as recipients.

Each prize recipient’s institution or organization will receive $500,000 in direct funding from Lyda Hill Philanthropies to accelerate their work.

== The Edith and Peter O'Donnell Awards ==
The Edith and Peter O’Donnell Awards were established in 2005 and first awarded in 2006. They are named in honor of Edith and Peter O’Donnell, who were among Texas’ most devoted advocates for excellence in scientific advancement and STEM education. The awards recognize rising star Texas researchers who are addressing the essential role that science and technology play in society and whose work meets the highest standards of exemplary professional performance, creativity and resourcefulness.

The O’Donnell Awards acknowledge outstanding achievements by Texas-based researchers in five categories: medicine, engineering, biological sciences, physical sciences and technology innovation.

Each award includes a $25,000 honorarium and an invitation to present at TAMEST’s Annual Conference each year. Since 2006, 19 O’Donnell Awards recipients have been elected to one of the National Academies and seven have been elected to multiple academies.

== The Mary Beth Maddox Award and Lectureship ==
The Mary Beth Maddox Award and Lectureship recognizes women scientists in Texas bringing new ideas and innovations to the fight against cancer.

It was established in honor of Mary Beth Maddox, former Executive Director of TAMEST, who passed away in 2018 after a valiant battle with pancreatic cancer.

The recipient is honored at the TAMEST Annual Conference, where they will present their research to attendees and also receive a $5,000 honorarium and award.

In addition to being honored at the TAMEST Annual Conference, the recipient will promote their work and discoveries across the state at established lecture and seminar series at TAMEST member institutions with NIH National Cancer Institute Designated Cancer Centers:

- Dan L Duncan Comprehensive Cancer Center, Baylor College of Medicine
- John H. Blaffer Lecture Series, MD Anderson Cancer Center
- Mays Cancer Center, UT Health San Antonio
- Excellence in Immunology Seminar Series, UT Southwestern Medical Center (in partnership with Simmons Cancer Center)

The award covers the recipient’s travel and lodging for the lectures and includes organized visits and networking at the NCI Cancer Centers. A $1,000 stipend is available to the recipient to provide childcare while traveling for the lecture series.

== TAMEST Protégé Program ==
Each year, TAMEST members have an opportunity to help nurture the next generation of researchers in Texas. Through the TAMEST Protégé Program, early-career researchers are selected by TAMEST members to attend the TAMEST annual conference. Each year, 40-50 Protégés attend a gathering of the Texas scientific community, learning about research taking place in Texas.

The program is designed as a mentorship tool for early-career researchers (ideally within 15 years of their first academic appointment or are early-career industry professionals). Protégés benefit from the mentorship of TAMEST members and get to network with top researchers in the state at the conference.

Benefits include:

Exclusive Networking Reception for Protégés

TAMEST hosts an exclusive networking reception for all current protégés. This event provides a platform for early-career researchers to connect, share their research and build relationships with their peers. By fostering a community among protégés, the reception aimed to create a supportive environment for professional growth and collaboration.

Breakfast Meeting with National Academy Members

A special breakfast meeting for protégés and National Academy members takes place at each conference, providing protégés an opportunity to network and learn more about the National Academies from elected members. Past breakfast meetings have also featured conversations with presidents of the National Academies.

Protégé Poster Challenge

The TAMEST Protégé Poster Challenge recognizes research and technology that could have significant impact on scientific understanding and society. This opportunity provides protégés a chance to showcase their research and innovation to research and industry leaders. Attendees include National Academy members, CEOs and business leaders, federal agency leaders and the greater scientific research community in Texas.

A maximum of fifty posters are invited to participate in the poster session on a first-come, first-served basis. Posters are self-organized into one of four categories: Medicine, Engineering, Science and Technology. The posters does not need to connect with the overall theme of the meeting.
