= Peter O'Donnell (businessman) =

American businessman (1924–2021)

Chair of the Texas Republican Party
- In office 1962–1969
- Preceded by: Thad Hutcheson
- Succeeded by: William Steger

Personal details
- Born: April 21, 1924 Dallas, Texas, U.S.
- Died: October 10, 2021 (aged 97) Dallas, Texas, U.S.
- Party: Republican
- Education: Sewanee: The University of the South; Wharton School of the University of Pennsylvania
- Profession: Investor and philanthropist

Peter J. O'Donnell Jr. (April 21, 1924 – October 10, 2021) was an American businessman, securities investor and philanthropist. From 1962 to 1969, he was the Texas Republican state chair. In 1963, he was also the national chair of the Draft Goldwater Committee.

== Background and personal life ==
O'Donnell was born and raised in Highland Park, near Dallas. He received a bachelor's degree in mathematics from Sewanee: The University of the South in Sewanee, Tennessee, and a Master of Business Administration from the Wharton School of the University of Pennsylvania in Philadelphia, Pennsylvania. After college, he worked first in a small bank and then tried his hand at real estate. However, his financial success came in the securities industry.

He died in Dallas, on October 10, 2021, at the age of 97.

== Philanthropist ==
In 1957, O'Donnell and his wife, the former Edith Jones (1926–2020), a graduate in psychology from the University of Texas at Austin, founded the O'Donnell Foundation, with the principal goal of improving higher education in Texas. The two contributed tens of millions of dollars, much of it anonymously, toward various educational entities, both public and private. The O'Donnell Foundation is the fifth largest independent foundation in Dallas. In 1983, the UT regents established the Peter O'Donnell Jr., Centennial Chair in Computing Systems."No one in history has had a greater impact on science and engineering in Texas than Peter O'Donnell," said J. Tinsley Oden, the mathematician and engineering professor and director of the UT Institute for Computational Engineering and Sciences. O'Donnell also worked to seek the expansion of the University of Texas at Dallas into a four-year institution and in obtaining the since defunct Superconducting Super Collider near Waxahachie in Ellis County south of Dallas. The trust is rooted in Mrs. O'Donnell's inheritance. In 2016, the couple resigned from leading the O'Donnell Foundation, according to their profile at the Texas State History Museum Foundation.

In 2008, O'Donnell was elected to the American Academy of Arts and Sciences and received a doctor of humane letters from Southern Methodist University in University Park, Texas. He served on the National Academy of Sciences and was a founding member, along with former U.S. Senator Kay Bailey Hutchison, of the Academy of Medicine, Engineering and Science of Texas, which distributes annual awards to outstanding scholars in those fields. In 2013, O'Donnell received the Distinguished Service Award from Texas Exes, the alumni association of the University of Texas. He was the director and member of the executive committee of University Medical Center, Inc. He was the former director of Dallas Biomedical Corporation, InterFirst Bank, and Stadium Associates.

In 2013, UT announced the naming of the O'Donnell Building for Applied Computational Engineering and Sciences. The O'Donnell Foundation has given more than $135 million to UT alone between 1983 and 2013. UT President William C. Powers declared the O'Donnells "among the greatest supporters of the University of Texas in its 130-year history. Their transformative generosity is based on the belief in our power to change society for the better." In 2008, O'Donnell pledged $18 million to finance the hiring of UT faculty members undertaking research in the use of mathematics, computers, and multiple scientific disciplines; his pledge was matched by W. A. "Tex" Moncrief Jr., an oilman and philanthropist from Fort Worth. The Arts and Technology Building at UT-Dallas was named in 2013 in Edith O'Donnell's honor.

In March 2022, the O’Donnell Foundation made a $100 million gift to UT Southwestern Medical Center to endow a new school of public health. It is the largest gift to any school of public health at a public university in the U.S.

== Political life ==
O'Donnell was a Texas delegate to the 1960 Republican National Convention in Chicago, which nominated the Nixon-Lodge ticket. He was an alternate delegate to the New Orleans convention in 1988, which nominated George Herbert Walker Bush and Dan Quayle. In the fall of 1960, O'Donnell was the Dallas County Republican chairman and compiled a record of considerable success. His responsibility was to recruit party workers to get out the vote for Nixon-Lodge and John Tower for the U.S. Senate, with whom O'Donnell was politically close.

In 1963, prior to the assassination of John F. Kennedy, as the state party chairman O'Donnell tried to convince the Republican National Committee to host the 1964 convention in Dallas, but received little support in his endeavor. The Dallas Chamber of Commerce doubted that the $500,000 needed to make a serious bid for the convention would be cost-effective. O'Donnell said he would try again in 1968 if his 1964 bid failed. It was not until 1984 that the GOP held its convention in Dallas, when delegates renominated the Reagan-Bush ticket.

O'Donnell's friend and political ally, Jack Crichton, the 1964 Texas Republican gubernatorial nominee against the later Republican convert John B. Connally Jr., describes O'Donnell as a "skilled organizer who located people around the nation who were in a position to promote the Goldwater cause." The director of the committee was New York City attorney F. Clifton White. After his nomination on July 15, 1964, at the Cow Palace in San Francisco, California, Goldwater, in Crichton's words, "with boundless energy campaigned vigorously selling his belief in less government control, supported private enterprise, and increasing capital investment, [and] halting the drift toward socialism and increasing our national debt."

O'Donnell served on the 1964 Republican national platform committee. Another Texan, Albert Bel Fay of Houston, was a member of the credentials committee in 1964 and was thereafter the Texas Republican national committeeman. In 1964, O'Donnell supported George H. W. Bush of Houston in his losing race for the U. S. Senate, first in the primary against Jack Cox, the 1962 Republican gubernatorial nominee, and then in the general election against the Democratic incumbent, Ralph Yarborough. The 1964 general election was a Republican disaster in Texas; with the defeats of U.S. Representatives Bruce Alger and Ed Foreman, the party was reduced to a single seat held by Frank Kell Cahoon of Midland in the 150-member Texas House of Representatives. Republican John Tower continued to hold the other Senate seat once filled by U.S. President Lyndon B. Johnson. In 1968, Chairman O'Donnell led the Nixon supporters in his state at the national convention in Miami Beach, Florida. This placed him in conflict once again with Jack Cox, the leader of the burgeoning forces backing Ronald Reagan in his first brief bid for the nomination. The 1968 Republican defeats in Texas, Hubert Humphrey won the state's electoral votes, and Conservative Democrat Preston Smith was elected governor over Republican Paul Eggers, led to calls to replace O'Donnell as chairman in 1969.

By 1972, the Republicans hoped once more to rebound in Texas. Albert Fay lost the Republican primary for governor to former Democratic State Senator Henry Grover, also of Houston. In turn, Grover was defeated in a fairly close vote by the Democrat Dolph Briscoe, but John Tower won a third term in the Senate.

In 1978, he was a key advisor to the narrow election of Bill Clements, the Dallas industrialist who became the first Republican governor of Texas since Reconstruction. In 1987, still an advisor to Clements in the first year of Clements' second nonconsecutive term, O'Donnell convinced the governor to abandon an unpopular proposal for higher taxes.

Over the years, O'Donnell has donated to various Republican candidates for office throughout the nation, including $245,000 between 2001 and 2010 to retiring Texas Governor Rick Perry. In 2011, O'Donnell, who usually kept a low public profile, criticized some of Perry's education proposals as "absurd", including replacing tenured faculty with lower-paid instructors, tying faculty bonuses to student evaluation of instruction, establishing a new accreditation of universities by an agency yet to be created, and the offering of an undergraduate degree that costs no more than $10,000.

In 2013, the O'Donnell Foundation named Dallas attorney Tom Luce as its chief operating officer. Formerly the chief of staff to the Texas Select Committee on Public Education, Luce was named in 2005 as the assistant United States Secretary of Education under Margaret Spellings by U.S. President George W. Bush. He was chairman of the National Math and Science Initiative. In the spring of 1990, Luce was an unsuccessful candidate for the Republican gubernatorial nomination, won by Clayton W. Williams Jr., of Midland, who then lost the general election to the Democrat Ann W. Richards.

Former UT President Larry Faulkner calls O'Donnell:

My candidate for the living Texan with the greatest impact on modern Texas. He built the Republican Party of Texas from zero, essentially, to the point where it won every statewide office. He has focused strongly on improvement of the universities, the schools, and moving education into a modern form at a modern level. And he has been interested in transformation of the economy and has done all he can to support bringing high-technology businesses into the state.
