= Scientists and Engineers for Johnson–Humphrey =

Organization against Barry Goldwater

Scientists and Engineers for Johnson–Humphrey was a group of prominent scientists consisting of U.S. President Dwight D. Eisenhower's second adviser George Kistiakowsky, Kennedy adviser Jerome Wiesner, and many scientists that took part in the Manhattan Project. This group's sole purpose was to make sure that Barry Goldwater, whom Nobel Laureate Harold Urey called a "blustery, threatening man", was not elected president.
