= F. Clifton White =

- Born: Frederick Clifton White; June 13, 1918; Leonardsville, New York, U.S.
- Died: January 9, 1993 (aged 74); Greenwich, Connecticut, U.S.
- Education: Colgate University
- Occupations: Professor at Ithaca College and Cornell University; Campaign consultant
- Political party: Republican; New York State Conservative Party Campaign strategist for the Draft Goldwater Committee, 1964
- Spouse: Gladys Bunnell White (m. 1940)
- Children: 2

Frederick Clifton White Sr. (June 13, 1918 - January 9, 1993) was an American political consultant and campaign manager for candidates of the Republican Party, the New York Conservative Party, and some foreign clients. He was a moving force behind the Draft Goldwater Committee from 1961 to 1964, which secured a majority of delegates to nominate U.S. Senator Barry M. Goldwater of Arizona as the Republican Party presidential candidate in the 1964 presidential election.

== Early life and education ==
White was born on June 13, 1918, in Leonardsville, New York, in Upstate New York. He attended Colgate University in Hamilton, New York, where he graduated in 1940.

== Career ==
White flew as a navigator on dozens of missions for the United States Army Air Corps during World War II, having earned the Distinguished Flying Cross. After the war, he taught political science at Ithaca College and Cornell University.

In his only candidacy, White was defeated in a Republican primary election for Congress in 1946, a heavily Republican year. His activism grew more intense; he served in Youth for Dewey, was a member of the New York Young Republican Club, and in 1948 and rose to chair the New York State Young Republicans organization. He was also chairman of the Republican parties in Ithaca and Tompkins County, New York. He attended all Republican national conventions from 1948 to 1992 and was widely recognized for his bow ties and colorful suits.

White's Young Republicans activism brought him into collaboration with William A. Rusher and John M. Ashbrook, in support of nominating a conservative Republican for President. The effort began quietly with meetings in 1961 with other party activists.

The movement grew to a full-time operation with the opening of a Manhattan office in the spring of 1962; its address in the Chanin Building gave White the title of his account of the Goldwater campaign, Suite 3505.

Goldwater's speech at the 1960 Republican National Convention included the phrase, "Let's grow up, conservatives. If we want to take this party back, and I think some day we can. Let's get to work." White and other younger activists took this as their rallying cry and ultimately convinced the reluctant Arizonan to run. Goldwater announced his candidacy less than two months after the assassination of John F. Kennedy.

=== 1964 presidential election ===
White was credited with organizing grassroots operations in several states that helped secure enough delegates for Barry Goldwater to win on the first ballot at the 1964 Republican National Convention in San Francisco. White’s team defeated the campaigns of New York Governor Nelson A. Rockefeller, Pennsylvania Governor William Scranton, and other candidates.

Following the convention, however, Goldwater declined to give White the lead role of chairman of the Republican National Committee, a designation which went instead to Dean Burch of Arizona. Goldwater named his personal friend of nearly three decades, Denison Kitchel, a Phoenix lawyer, as the national campaign manager. According to author Theodore H. White (no relation), Clif White was "dismissed" to "an outer circle of advisers."

White was left to organize an independent campaign, Citizens for Goldwater-Miller. The group sponsored the national broadcast of October 27, 1964, "A Time for Choosing", featuring a speech by actor Ronald Reagan warning of the dire national consequences unless Goldwater won the election. Inexplicably, several of Goldwater's close advisers tried to halt the Reagan broadcast. As widely predicted, Goldwater was overwhelmed by incumbent President Lyndon B. Johnson.

Reagan's speech for Citizens of Goldwater-Miller in 1964 is considered the launching pad of his career in politics. In 1968, White guided Ronald Reagan's brief presidential campaign. At the time Reagan had been governor of California for fewer than two years. Reagan came in third at the 1968 Republican National Convention held in Miami Beach, Florida, with 182 delegates, behind Rockefeller and first-ballot winner Richard M. Nixon, the former Vice President of the United States.

=== 1970 campaign ===
Back in New York, White managed the 1970 campaign of James L. Buckley, brother of the journalist William F. Buckley Jr., for the U.S. Senate on the Conservative Party line. Backed (tacitly) by Nixon and Vice-President Agnew, Buckley won the three-way contest with 38.8 percent of the vote. The Buckley campaign was his first with young pollster Arthur J. Finkelstein, with whom White would go into business in their consulting firm, DirAction Services. Their 1972 campaigns included the Committee to Re-Elect the President (Finkelstein as one of several pollsters), and the successful bid of broadcaster Jesse Helms for the U.S. Senate from North Carolina.

White broke with most conservatives and remained loyal to President Gerald R. Ford Jr. against Ronald Reagan in the contest for the 1976 Republican nomination. Once in the White House in 1981, President Reagan named White as the director of broadcasting company Radio Marti, which aired pro-U.S. programming to communist Cuba.

=== Foreign clients ===
His foreign clients included President Carlos Andrés Pérez of Venezuela, in Pérez's successful 1973 election campaign. He also served as president of the International Association of Political Consultants, and of its U.S. branch. His corporate clients included U.S. Steel, Standard Oil of Indiana and General Electric.

=== Ashbrook Center ===
White was the founding director of the Ashbrook Center for Public Affairs at Ashland University in Ashland, Ohio, a position that he held from 1983 until retirement in 1992.

== Death ==
White died in Greenwich, Connecticut, on January 9, 1993, at age 74.

== Legacy ==
White wrote several books, including Suite 3505: The Story of the Draft Goldwater Movement (1967) and Why Reagan Won: The Conservative Movement 1964-81 (1981), both co-authored with William J. Gill.
