= Draft Goldwater Committee =

Political organizers

The Draft Goldwater Committee was the organization primarily responsible for engineering the nomination of Arizona Senator Barry Goldwater for President of the United States on the 1964 Republican Party ticket.

== Beginnings ==
The effort to draft Goldwater and to secure his nomination began with a secret meeting at a Chicago motel on October 8, 1961. F. Clifton White, a longtime party activist and official from Upstate New York, discussed the possibility of a Goldwater campaign with twenty-two activists, most of them members of Young Republican organizations throughout the U.S. A December meeting (this one attended by Governor Tim Babcock of Montana) determined to divide the country into nine regions for organizing, and to raise sufficient funds to open a national office.

The movement grew to a full-time operation with a Manhattan office opened in the spring of 1962; its address in the Chanin Building gave Clif White the title of his account of the Goldwater campaign, Suite 3505. As the committee's efforts continued throughout 1962, the national press learned of and reported on a meeting that December. White met with Goldwater in January 1963 to discuss their activities; "Goldwater, annoyed by the publicity, chilled White but did not repudiate him outright," wrote journalist Theodore H. White in his Making of the President 1964.

== Going public ==
By February 1963, the organization had grown to hundreds of operatives and activists, and its executive committee decided to go public, with the formation of the National Draft Goldwater Committee, headed by Peter O'Donnell Jr., then chairman of the Texas Republican Party. He soon brought aboard Wirt Yerger, first modern chairman of the Mississippi Republican Party. The first public event was a July 4 rally at the District of Columbia Armory. Dozens of busloads (including 43 from New York State alone) helped deliver a crowd of 7,000 for the event (Goldwater himself did not attend).

In the coming months, Goldwater continued to keep his distance from White's volunteer organization, but brought attorney Denison Kitchel to Washington to oversee his campaign operations, ostensibly for his scheduled Senate re-election in 1964. By November 1963, it was seen as certain by White, Kitchel and others that Goldwater would run—and then came Kennedy's assassination in Dallas. The hoped-for contrast between the liberal Easterner Kennedy and the conservative Westerner Goldwater was now lost; the Arizonan would be facing a Texan whose ideology was far less obvious than Kennedy's. Moreover, would the country be prepared to have three different men as President in just 14 months?

Pressed by Senate colleagues and GOP organizational allies, Goldwater dithered through December, and on January 3, 1964, declared his candidacy for President.

== Primaries ==
In the coming months, White's operation (now with a full-time Washington headquarters at 1025 Connecticut Ave. NW) locked up commitments and delegates in state after state. They were surprised when Henry Cabot Lodge Jr., won a write-in campaign in the New Hampshire presidential primary, and followed with wins in New Jersey and his native Massachusetts. However, Lodge tired of campaigning and withdrew his candidacy. In the meantime, Goldwater won primaries in Illinois, Texas, Indiana and Nebraska.

By this time, Governor Nelson Rockefeller of New York emerged as the strongest moderate challenger, and he won primaries in West Virginia and Oregon, while Governor William Scranton of Pennsylvania and Governor Jim Rhodes of Ohio won favorite-son contests and controlled their states' large delegations.

The final showdown came in California on June 2: Rockefeller's bottomless campaign funding against the Draft Goldwater organizers. Goldwater triumphed, 51% to 49%, and under the winner-take-all rules of the time, he received the entire 86-strong California delegation.

== Nomination ==
The result was an easy first-ballot nomination victory for Goldwater, who captured 883 votes, to 214 for Scranton and 114 for Rockefeller.

In all, the Draft Goldwater effort resulted in Goldwater taking 2,267,079 (38.33%) of the primary vote, compared to 1,304,204 (22.05%) for Rockefeller; no other competitor topped 11%. But this actually understates the Arizonan's advantage; at this time, dozens of state Republican parties selected their delegates in conventions and caucuses, and this is where the Draft Goldwater Committee held its main advantage.

== Election defeat ==
White and the organizers of the Draft Goldwater Committee were largely shut out of the fall campaign, shunted aside to the Citizens for Goldwater-Miller Committee. Goldwater was defeated that November by Johnson in an epic landslide.
