= Monique Luiz =

American former child model (born 1961)

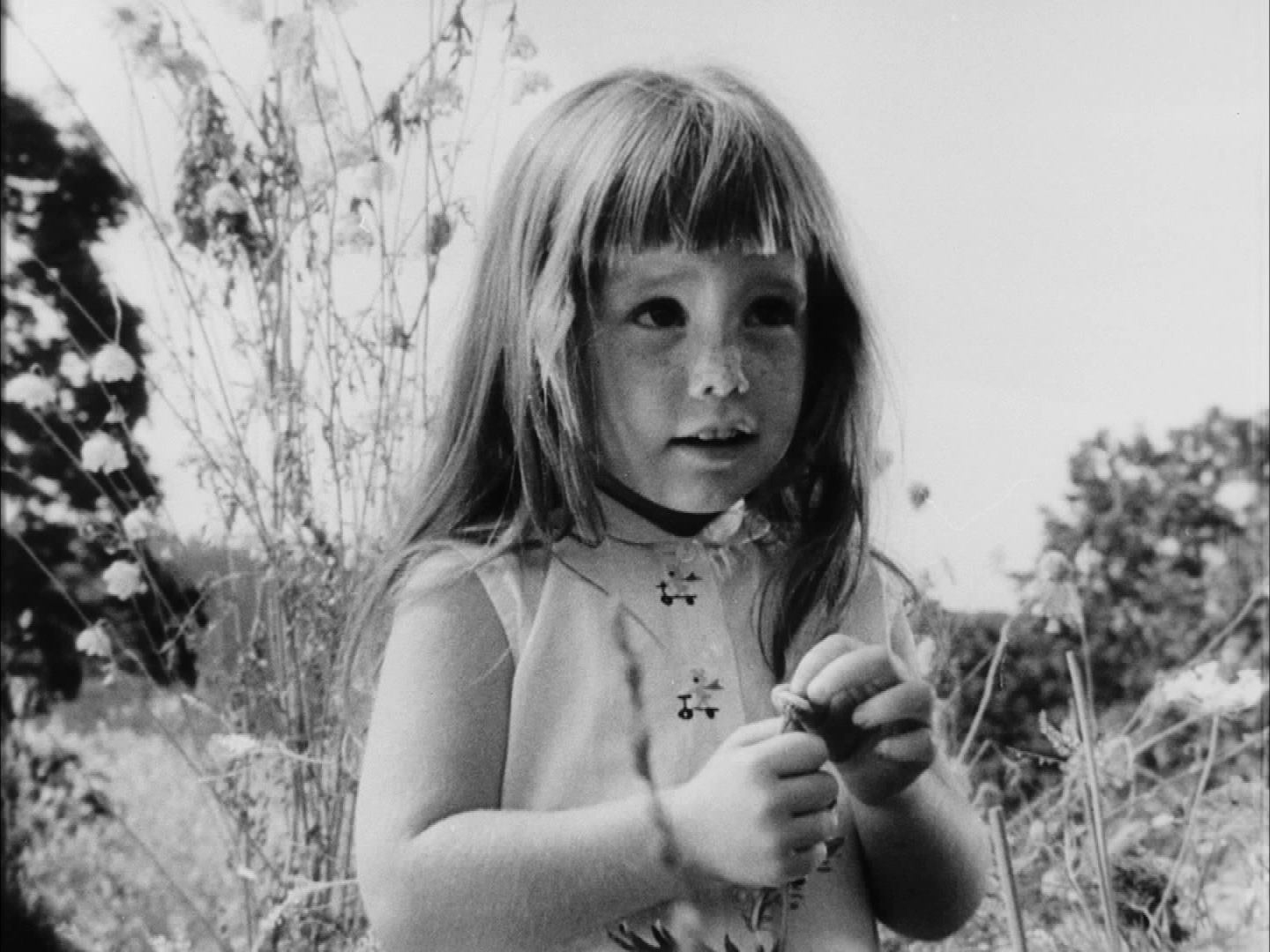
- Still from the "Daisy" political advertisement
- Born: Monique M. Corzilius; May 3, 1961 (age 65); Pine Beach, New Jersey, U.S.
- Other name: Monique Cozy
- Occupation: Child model
- Known for: "Daisy" (1964)
- Spouse: Manuel Luiz

Monique M. Luiz (née Corzilius; born May 3, 1961), also known as "Daisy Girl" or "Peace, Little Girl", is an American former child model best known for appearing in the "Daisy" advertisement, part of then incumbent president Lyndon B. Johnson's 1964 presidential campaign.

Corzilius appeared in her first television commercial role at the age of two, using the stage name Monique Cozy. She appeared in television advertisements for advertisers including Kodak, Velveeta, and Prudential Insurance. She moved to France with her parents in 1975 and married there before returning to the United States in 1983. She appeared in the 2014 documentary Bombs Away and was recruited by Hillary Clinton, the 2016 Democratic presidential nominee, to appear in an advertisement for her presidential campaign against Donald Trump.

== Early life and "Daisy" ==
Monique M. Corzilius was born on May 3, 1961, and raised in Pine Beach, New Jersey. She was the youngest of Fred and Colette Corzilius' three children. During her childhood, her mother took her to child acting auditions in the New York City. Working under the stage name Monique Cozy, her first professional appearance was at the age of two, modeling in a print advertisement for Lipton soup. She also appeared in advertisements for companies including Kodak, Velveeta, Prudential Insurance.

The "Daisy" advertisement

In 1964, Corzilius was selected to act in the "Daisy" advertisement, part of then incumbent president Lyndon B. Johnson's 1964 presidential campaign against Senator Barry Goldwater. The main concept of "Daisy" was to communicate Johnson's anti-war and anti-nuclear positions, contrasting them with Goldwater's support for the use of nuclear weapons in the Vietnam War. The advertisement began with Corzilius standing in a meadow, picking petals of a daisy and counting from one to nine. She skipped a few numbers and repeated some twice. After various takes, it was decided that a miscount might be more appealing to the voters. After she reached "nine", a booming male voice was then heard counting the numbers backward from "ten", similar to a missile launch countdown. The scene then cut to footage of mushroom clouds following a nuclear explosion, and the final frame read: "Vote for President Johnson on November 3" (written in all caps), then adding, "The stakes are too high for you to stay home."

According to Corzilius, her parents were unaware that she was in a political commercial. She was paid $105 (equivalent to $1,090 in 2025) for acting in "Daisy". The advertisement was aired at 9:50 p.m. EST on September 7, on the premise that most young children would be asleep, leaving their parents watching the television, and eventually be influenced to visualize their child in Corzilius' role. Although broadcast only once, the ad was considered one of the most popular and controversial political advertisements. Corzilius was later depicted on the cover page of the September 25 issue of Time magazine. She continued to appear in television and print advertisements for several years following "Daisy". In 1967, she appeared in an ad for Kool-Aid Popsicles.

== Later life ==
In 1975, Corzilius and her parents moved to Philippsbourg, Bitcherland, France, where she married Portuguese Manuel Luiz before returning to the United States in 1983. The couple settled in Phoenix, Arizona. She did not see the "Daisy" commercial until the 2000s, when she searched for it on the Internet. Another child actor, Birgitte Olsen, falsely claimed that she was the child actor in the commercial. Monique's husband Manuel became a naturalized American citizen in 2011. As of 2014, she worked as a human-resources supervisor at a Phoenix bank. She appeared in the 2014 documentary Bombs Away about the 1964 presidential election and its role in ushering "in a new age of highly negative television advertising".

While campaigning for the 2016 presidential election, Democratic nominee Hillary Clinton enlisted Monique to appear in a "sequel" commercial for Clinton's unsuccessful presidential campaign against Donald Trump. The ad featured Luiz introducing herself, in voice-over with footage from the original "Daisy" ad. She said, "The fear of nuclear war that we had as children, I never thought our children would ever have to deal with that again. And to see that coming forward in this election is really scary." The spot was aired during the commercial breaks of evening newscasts in Arizona, Florida, Iowa, Nevada, New Hampshire, North Carolina, Ohio, and Pennsylvania.

== See also ==
- Barry Goldwater 1964 presidential campaign
