= Confessions of a Republican =

Political ad for Lyndon Johnson's 1964 US presidential campaign

- The "Confessions of a Republican" advertisement, runtime
- Agency: Doyle Dane Bernbach
- Client: Democratic National Committee; Lyndon B. Johnson 1964 presidential campaign
- Running time: 4 minutes, 21 seconds
- Country: United States

"Confessions of a Republican" is a political advertisement aired on television during the 1964 United States presidential election by incumbent president Lyndon B. Johnson's campaign.

== Background of creation ==
In the advertisement, a man in his late twenties speaks to the camera about his pride in the Republican Party's past, before admitting that he is frightened by Republican nominee Barry Goldwater. He expresses alarm at Goldwater's contradictory, confrontational political views and support from the Ku Klux Klan (the result of his opposition to the Civil Rights Act of 1964) and says that he is afraid of Goldwater's instability and aggressive approach, and fears that it might lead to a nuclear war with the U.S.S.R. He explains that he believes that the party is making a great mistake, and that he will be voting for Johnson in the election.

The four-minute ad was produced by DDB in July 1964. It was a requirement of the casting that actor William Bogert be a Republican. While Bogert was performing a script rather than expressing his own views and is not presented by name, he has described the ad as similar to his own viewpoint and said that he was allowed to improvise somewhat to include his own thoughts on the election.

Though less well-remembered than Johnson's "Daisy" ad (also suggesting that Goldwater might start a nuclear war), it ran in the North and was intended to develop fears about Barry Goldwater and his supporters, such as the then head of the Ku Klux Klan.

The Museum of the Moving Image report on the ad notes that DDB contracted with the Democrats in the summer of 1963, after President John F. Kennedy had been impressed by their quirky advertising for Volkswagen (the Think Small campaign) and for Avis (the We Try Harder campaign). A DDB spokesman reportedly told Johnson's advisers that "We are deadly afraid of Goldwater and feel that the world must be handed a Johnson landslide."

== Broadcast and later usage ==
Bogert was interviewed about the ad for its 50th anniversary in 2014, saying that he believed that Tea Party activists had many undesirable attributes in common with Goldwater, and that he had not voted Republican for a long time.

The advertisement was the subject of renewed attention in March 2016 because of Donald Trump's success in Republican primaries. Bogert, by then 80 years of age, was interviewed again on The Rachel Maddow Show on May 2, 2016 and asked to draw comparisons between Goldwater's 1964 policy stances and Donald Trump's 2016 politics. He appeared in a remake of the advertisement produced by the Hillary Clinton campaign in July 2016 with alterations based on Trump's public statements on nuclear warfare.
