= Pine Beach, New Jersey =

Borough in Ocean County, New Jersey, US

- Borough
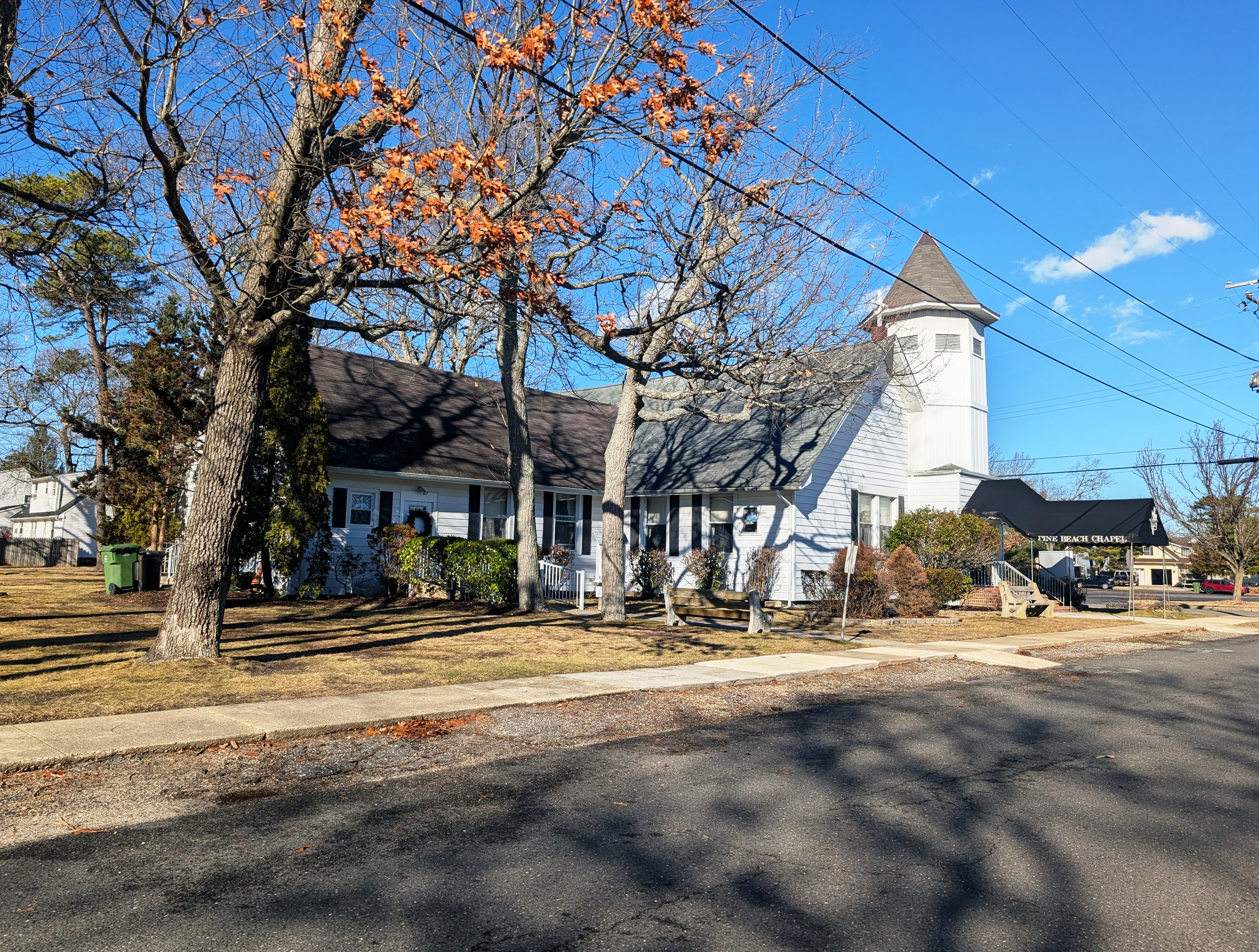
- Pine Beach Chapel

- Seal

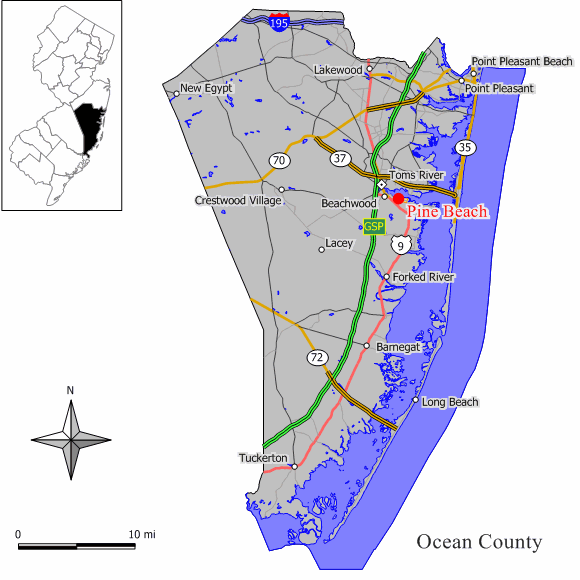
- Map of Pine Beach in Ocean County. Inset: Location of Ocean County highlighted in the State of New Jersey.

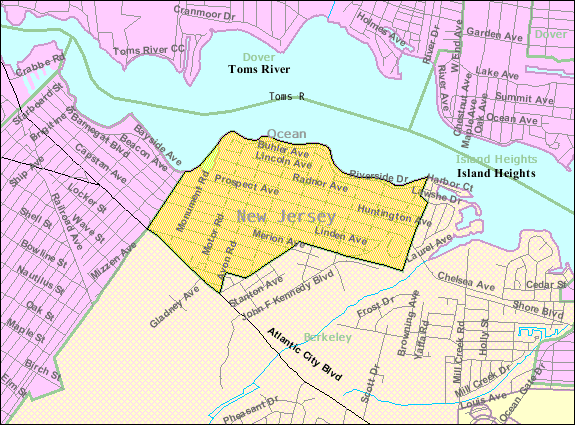
- Census Bureau map of Pine Beach, New Jersey

- Location in Ocean County Location in New Jersey Location in the United States
- Coordinates: 39.936058°N 74.169789°W
- Country: United States
- state: New Jersey
- County: Ocean
- Incorporated: February 26, 1925

Government
  - Type: Borough
  - Body: Borough Council
  - Mayor: Lawrence W. Cuneo (R, term ends December 31, 2027)
  - Municipal clerk: Charlene A. Carney

Area
  - Total: 0.64 sq mi (1.66 km^{2})
  - Land: 0.64 sq mi (1.65 km^{2})
  - Water: 0.0039 sq mi (0.01 km^{2}) 0.78%
  - Rank: 533rd of 565 in state 31st of 33 in county
- Elevation: 16 ft (4.9 m)

Population (2020)
  - Total: 2,139
  - Estimate (2023): 2,193
  - Rank: 481st of 565 in state 21st of 33 in county
  - Density: 3,362.1/sq mi (1,298.1/km^{2})
  - Rank: 200th of 565 in state 6th of 33 in county
- Time zone: UTC−05:00 (Eastern (EST))
  - Summer (DST): UTC−04:00 (Eastern (EDT))
- ZIP Code: 08741
- Area code: 732
- FIPS code: 3402958590
- GNIS feature ID: 0885351
- Website: pinebeachnj.gov

Pine Beach is a borough in Ocean County, in the U.S. state of New Jersey. As of the 2020 United States census, the borough's population was 2,139, its highest ever decennial count and an increase of 12 (+0.6%) from the 2010 census count of 2,127, which in turn reflected an increase of 177 (+9.1%) from the 1,950 counted in the 2000 census.

Pine Beach was incorporated as a borough by an act of the New Jersey Legislature on February 26, 1925, from portions of Berkeley Township.

== Geography ==
According to the United States Census Bureau, the borough had a total area of 0.64 square miles (1.66 km^{2}), including 0.64 square miles (1.65 km^{2}) of land and 0.01 square miles (0.01 km^{2}) of water (0.78%).

The borough borders the Ocean County municipalities of Beachwood and Berkeley Township.

The borough is one of 11 municipalities in Ocean County that are part of the Toms River watershed.

== Demographics ==
Historical population
Census	Pop.	Note	%±
1930	72		—
1940	163		126.4%
1950	495		203.7%
1960	985		99.0%
1970	1,395		41.6%
1980	1,796		28.7%
1990	1,954		8.8%
2000	1,950		−0.2%
2010	2,127		9.1%
2020	2,139		0.6%
2023 (est.)	2,193	▲	2.5%
Population sources: 1930–2000 1930; 1940–2000 2000; 2010 2020

=== 2020 census ===
As of the 2020 census, Pine Beach had a population of 2,139. The median age was 47.0 years. 19.0% of residents were under the age of 18 and 21.9% of residents were 65 years of age or older. For every 100 females there were 93.8 males, and for every 100 females age 18 and over there were 91.7 males age 18 and over.

100.0% of residents lived in urban areas, while 0.0% lived in rural areas.

There were 840 households in Pine Beach, of which 28.7% had children under the age of 18 living in them. Of all households, 57.5% were married-couple households, 13.8% were households with a male householder and no spouse or partner present, and 23.5% were households with a female householder and no spouse or partner present. About 21.2% of all households were made up of individuals and 10.1% had someone living alone who was 65 years of age or older.

There were 931 housing units, of which 9.8% were vacant. The homeowner vacancy rate was 2.0% and the rental vacancy rate was 0.8%.

Racial composition as of the 2020 census
Race	Number	Percent
White	1,923	89.9%
Black or African American	22	1.0%
American Indian and Alaska Native	1	0.0%
Asian	31	1.4%
Native Hawaiian and Other Pacific Islander	0	0.0%
Some other race	25	1.2%
Two or more races	137	6.4%
Hispanic or Latino (of any race)	133	6.2%

=== 2010 census ===
The 2010 United States census counted 2,127 people, 818 households, and 617 families in the borough. The population density was 3,465.4 inhabitants per square mile (1,338.0/km^{2}). There were 903 housing units at an average density of 1,471.2 per square mile (568.0/km^{2}). The racial makeup was 96.47% (2,052) White, 0.38% (8) Black or African American, 0.14% (3) Native American, 1.41% (30) Asian, 0.00% (0) Pacific Islander, 0.71% (15) from other races, and 0.89% (19) from two or more races. Hispanic or Latino of any race were 3.71% (79) of the population.

Of the 818 households, 29.6% had children under the age of 18; 59.9% were married couples living together; 10.3% had a female householder with no husband present and 24.6% were non-families. Of all households, 21.1% were made up of individuals and 10.5% had someone living alone who was 65 years of age or older. The average household size was 2.59 and the average family size was 3.00.

22.4% of the population were under the age of 18, 6.8% from 18 to 24, 20.9% from 25 to 44, 33.2% from 45 to 64, and 16.6% who were 65 years of age or older. The median age was 44.9 years. For every 100 females, the population had 92.8 males. For every 100 females ages 18 and older there were 85.6 males.

The Census Bureau's 2006–2010 American Community Survey showed that (in 2010 inflation-adjusted dollars) median household income was $75,972 (with a margin of error of +/− $10,628) and the median family income was $88,393 (+/− $8,889). Males had a median income of $58,542 (+/− $10,247) versus $40,781 (+/− $12,701) for females. The per capita income for the borough was $31,923 (+/− $3,004). About 1.9% of families and 2.7% of the population were below the poverty line, including 2.0% of those under age 18 and 7.7% of those age 65 or over.

=== 2000 census ===
As of the 2000 United States census there were 1,950 people, 767 households, and 558 families residing in the borough. The population density was 3,130.3 inhabitants per square mile (1,208.6/km^{2}). There were 872 housing units at an average density of 1,399.8 per square mile (540.5/km^{2}). The racial makeup of the borough was 98.41% White, 0.26% African American, 0.05% Native American, 0.62% Asian, 0.21% from other races, and 0.46% from two or more races. Hispanic or Latino of any race were 2.36% of the population.

There were 767 households, out of which 30.4% had children under the age of 18 living with them, 61.8% were married couples living together, 8.1% had a female householder with no husband present, and 27.2% were non-families. 22.4% of all households were made up of individuals, and 12.1% had someone living alone who was 65 years of age or older. The average household size was 2.54 and the average family size was 3.01.

In the borough the population was spread out, with 22.7% under the age of 18, 5.7% from 18 to 24, 27.2% from 25 to 44, 27.1% from 45 to 64, and 17.3% who were 65 years of age or older. The median age was 42 years. For every 100 females, there were 93.1 males. For every 100 females age 18 and over, there were 87.7 males.

The median income for a household in the borough was $57,366, and the median income for a family was $67,404. Males had a median income of $50,256 versus $34,038 for females. The per capita income for the borough was $26,487. About 2.5% of families and 3.5% of the population were below the poverty line, including 5.0% of those under age 18 and 3.0% of those age 65 or over.

== Government ==
=== Local government ===
Pine Beach is governed under the borough form of New Jersey municipal government, which is used in 218 municipalities (of the 564) statewide, making it the most common form of government in New Jersey. The governing body is comprised of the mayor and the borough council, with all positions elected at-large on a partisan basis as part of the November general election. The mayor is elected directly by the voters to a four-year term of office. The borough council includes six members elected to serve three-year terms on a staggered basis, with two seats coming up for election each year in a three-year cycle. The borough form of government used by Pine Beach is a "weak mayor / strong council" government in which council members act as the legislative body with the mayor presiding at meetings and voting only in the event of a tie. The mayor can veto ordinances subject to an override by a two-thirds majority vote of the council. The mayor makes committee and liaison assignments for council members, and most appointments are made by the mayor with the advice and consent of the council.

As of 2022, the mayor of the Borough of Pine Beach is Republican Lawrence W. Cuneo, whose term of office ends December 31, 2023. Members of the Pine Beach Borough Council are Susan Coletti (R, 2023), James Keesling (R, 2024), Raymond Newman (R, 2022), Richard Polhemus (R, 2023), James Saxton (R, 2024) and Barry Wieck (R, 2022).

=== Federal, state, and county representation ===
Pine Beach is located in the 4th Congressional District and is part of New Jersey's 9th state legislative district.

For the 119th United States Congress, New Jersey's 4th congressional district is represented by Chris Smith (R, Manchester Township). New Jersey is represented in the United States Senate by Democrats Cory Booker (Newark, term ends 2027) and Andy Kim (Moorestown, term ends 2031).

For the 2026–2027 session, the 9th legislative district of the New Jersey Legislature is represented in the State Senate by Carmen Amato (R, Berkeley Township) and in the General Assembly by Greg Myhre (R, Stafford Township) and Brian E. Rumpf (R, Little Egg Harbor Township).

Ocean County is governed by a Board of County Commissioners composed of five members who are elected on an at-large basis in partisan elections and serving staggered three-year terms of office, with either one or two seats coming up for election each year as part of the November general election. At an annual reorganization held in the beginning of January, the board chooses a director and a deputy director from among its members. As of 2025, Ocean County's Commissioners (with party affiliation, term-end year and residence) are:

John P. Kelly (R, 2025, Eagleswood Township), Virginia E. Haines (R, 2025, Toms River), Robert Arace (R, Manchester Township, 2027) Jennifer Bacchione (R, Berkeley Township, 2027) and Frank Sadeghi (R, 2026, Toms River).

Constitutional officers elected on a countywide basis are: Clerk Scott M. Colabella (R, 2025, Barnegat Light), Sheriff Michael G. Mastronardy (R, 2025; Toms River) and Surrogate Jeffrey Moran (R, 2028, Beachwood).

=== Politics ===
As of March 2011, there were a total of 1,609 registered voters in Pine Beach, of which 367 (22.8%) were registered as Democrats, 505 (31.4%) were registered as Republicans and 736 (45.7%) were registered as Unaffiliated. There was one voter registered to another party. Among the borough's 2010 Census population, 75.6% (vs. 63.2% in Ocean County) were registered to vote, including 97.5% of those ages 18 and over (vs. 82.6% countywide).

Gubernatorial election results for Pine Beach
Year	Republican		Democratic		Third party(ies)	
Year	No.	%	No.	%	No.	%
2025	725	56.16%	559	43.30%	7	0.54%
2021	634	61.20%	397	38.32%	5	0.48%
2017	476	57.98%	311	37.88%	34	4.14%
2013	622	70.28%	243	27.46%	20	2.26%
2009	606	63.59%	279	29.28%	68	7.14%
2005	525	54.80%	389	40.61%	44	4.59%

In the 2012 presidential election, Republican Mitt Romney received 53.2% of the vote (648 cast), ahead of Democrat Barack Obama with 45.4% (554 votes), and other candidates with 1.4% (17 votes), among the 1,225 ballots cast by the borough's 1,661 registered voters (6 ballots were spoiled), for a turnout of 73.8%. In the 2008 presidential election, Republican John McCain received 55.3% of the vote (742 cast), ahead of Democrat Barack Obama with 41.5% (557 votes) and other candidates with 2.1% (28 votes), among the 1,341 ballots cast by the borough's 1,663 registered voters, for a turnout of 80.6%. In the 2004 presidential election, Republican George W. Bush received 57.4% of the vote (737 ballots cast), outpolling Democrat John Kerry with 40.8% (523 votes) and other candidates with 1.2% (19 votes), among the 1,283 ballots cast by the borough's 1,606 registered voters, for a turnout percentage of 79.9.

Presidential Elections Results
Year	Republican	Democratic	Third Parties
2024	56.1% 843	42.0% 632	1.9% 26
2020	54.3% 792	43.7% 637	2.0% 24
2016	58.8% 730	37.7% 468	3.5% 43
2012	53.2% 648	45.4% 554	1.4% 17
2008	55.3% 742	41.5% 557	2.1% 28
2004	57.4% 737	40.8% 523	1.2% 19

In the 2013 gubernatorial election, Republican Chris Christie received 70.3% of the vote (622 cast), ahead of Democrat Barbara Buono with 27.5% (243 votes), and other candidates with 2.3% (20 votes), among the 918 ballots cast by the borough's 1,666 registered voters (33 ballots were spoiled), for a turnout of 55.1%. In the 2009 gubernatorial election, Republican Chris Christie received 63.0% of the vote (606 ballots cast), ahead of Democrat Jon Corzine with 29.0% (279 votes), Independent Chris Daggett with 5.9% (57 votes) and other candidates with 1.1% (11 votes), among the 962 ballots cast by the borough's 1,650 registered voters, yielding a 58.3% turnout.

United States Senate election results for Pine Beach1
Year	Republican		Democratic		Third party(ies)	
Year	No.	%	No.	%	No.	%
2024	779	53.21%	670	45.77%	15	1.02%
2018	614	57.87%	396	37.32%	51	4.81%
2012	640	55.03%	504	43.34%	19	1.63%
2006	525	58.27%	338	37.51%	38	4.22%

United States Senate election results for Pine Beach2
Year	Republican		Democratic		Third party(ies)	
Year	No.	%	No.	%	No.	%
2020	807	56.75%	600	42.19%	15	1.05%
2014	409	57.36%	283	39.69%	21	2.95%
2013	346	61.68%	210	37.43%	5	0.89%
2008	716	57.65%	509	40.98%	17	1.37%

== Education ==
Public school students in pre-kindergarten through twelfth grade attend the Toms River Regional Schools, a regional public school district based in Toms River Township that also includes student from the boroughs of Beachwood, Pine Beach and South Toms River, as well as Toms River Township who attend as part of sending/receiving relationships. As of the 2026-2027 school year, the district, comprised of 18 schools, had an enrollment of over 14,000 students and 153.4 classroom teachers (on an FTE basis), for a student–teacher ratio of 8.7:1. The town has one of the district's 12 elementary schools, Pine Beach Elementary educating students from Pre-K to 5th grade, students go to Toms River Intermediate South for grades 6-8, and Toms River High School South for grades 9-12. The district's board of education has nine members; seats are allocated based on population, with one seat allocated to Pine Beach. That seat is currently held by Kevin Kidney who took office in January 2020.

Admiral Farragut Academy, which was established in 1933, operated until 1994, when its campus in Pine Beach was closed due to financial difficulties. The school continues to operate on an independent campus in St. Petersburg, Florida.

== Transportation ==
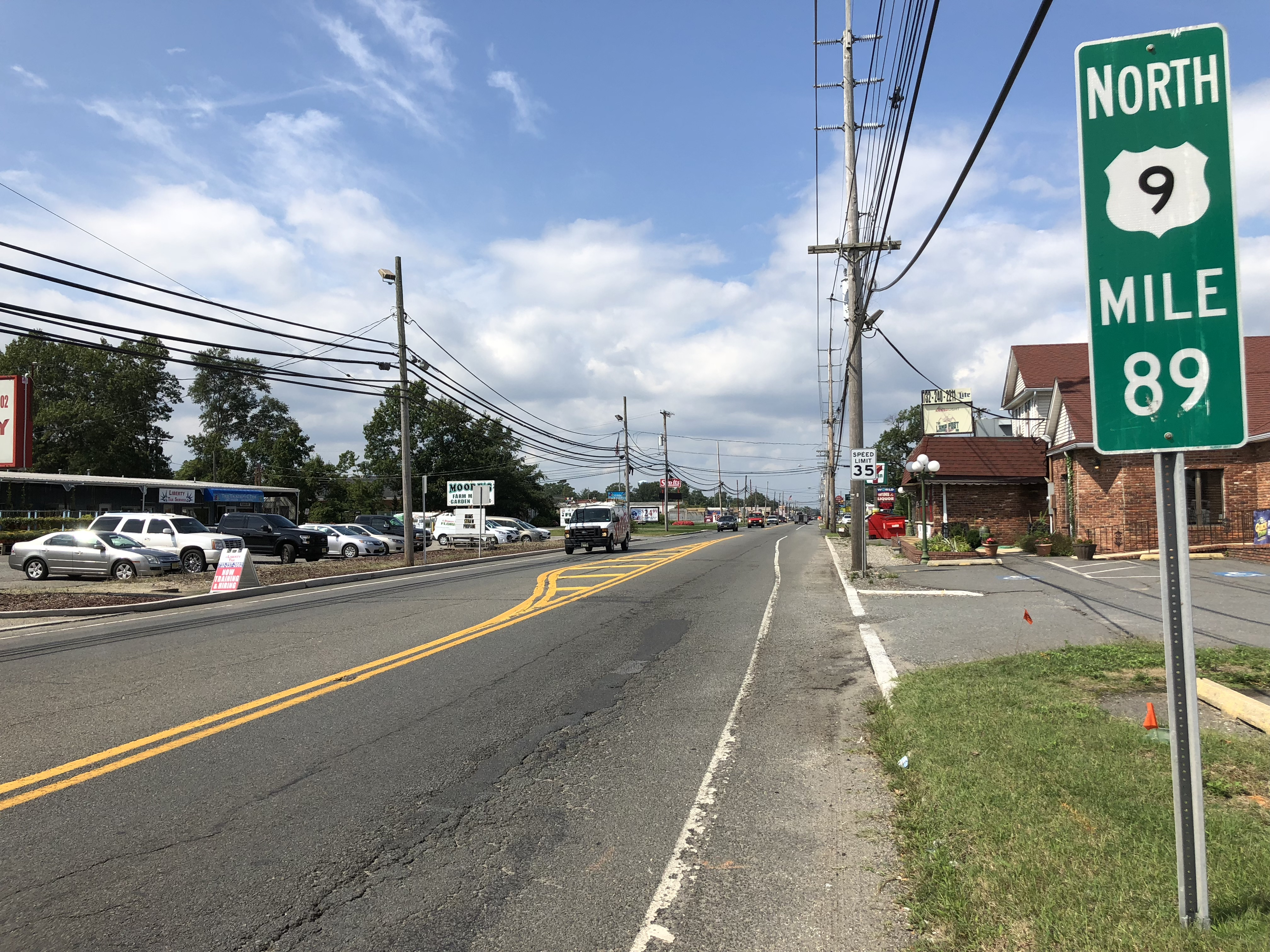
Route 9 northbound on the edge of Pine Beach

=== Roads and highways ===
As of May 2010, the borough had a total of 15.22 miles (24.49 km) of roadways, of which 11.32 miles (18.22 km) were maintained by the municipality, 3.64 miles (5.86 km) by Ocean County and 0.26 miles (0.42 km) by the New Jersey Department of Transportation.

One side of Route 9 travels along the borough's border with Berkeley Township.

=== Public transportation ===
NJ Transit provides bus service between the borough and Atlantic City on the 559 bus route.

== Notable people ==
People who were born in, residents of, or otherwise closely associated with Pine Beach include:

- U. E. Baughman (1905–1978), chief of the United States Secret Service between 1948 and 1961, under Presidents Truman, Eisenhower and Kennedy
- Monique Luiz (born 1961), woman best known for starring in a famous television advertisement for Lyndon Johnson's 1964 presidential campaign known as "Daisy"
- Benjamin H. Mabie, politician who served in the New Jersey General Assembly for three terms and served as mayor of Pine Beach
- George Winterling (born 1931), retired television weatherman who was the creator of the heat index
