= Gene Case =

American advertising executive (1937–2010)

Eugene Lawrence Case
- Born: Knoxville, Tennessee. U.S.
- Died: September 9, 2010 (aged 72); Manhattan, New York, U.S.
- Education: Cornell University
- Occupation: Advertising executive
- Known for: Developing advertising campaigns for Mennen Skin Bracer and Tums; Political ad campaigns for Lyndon B. Johnson, Nelson Rockefeller, and Robert F. Wagner; Co-founder of Jordan McGrath Case & Partners
- Children: 4

Eugene Lawrence Case (December 6, 1937 – September 9, 2010) was an American advertising executive who developed campaigns for Mennen Skin Bracer and Tums, and developed ads for political campaigns for Lyndon B. Johnson's 1964 presidential election campaign, as well as for Nelson Rockefeller and Robert F. Wagner. Case was a founder of the firm Jordan McGrath Case & Partners.

== Early life ==
Case was born on December 6, 1937, in Knoxville, Tennessee, where his father worked for the Tennessee Valley Authority. The success his father had in the New Deal helped shape Case's liberal philosophy, saying "I saw government lift [my home] region out of Appalachian-style poverty". He earned his undergraduate degree from Cornell University, where he majored in architecture and was a member of the Quill and Dagger society. He entered the advertising field in 1961, when he took a position as a copywriter at the J. Walter Thompson agency.

== Advertising career ==
While with Doyle Dane Bernbach, Case worked with Tony Schwartz as part of the team that developed the "Daisy ad" for Johnson's 1964 campaign. Depicting a girl counting petals plucked from a daisy, the voiceover changes to a countdown that ends with the mushroom cloud of a nuclear explosion. Case wrote the copy for another Johnson ad in which a man who says he had always been a Republican speaks to the camera for four minutes about his fear of Barry Goldwater being elected. Case worked for Nelson Rockefeller's successful bid for a third term as Governor of New York in the 1966 elections where he produced ads on pollution control, and he later worked on New York City mayoral bids by Robert F. Wagner and Bella Abzug.

Case founded Jordan McGrath Case & Partners with Helmut Krone in 1969, operating out of a suite at the Plaza Hotel, with Pat McGrath joining shortly thereafter. A $500,000 campaign they nabbed that year for Angostura bitters was the agency's first commercial account. There he developed the "Thanks. I needed that." campaign for Mennen's Skin Bracer aftershave and the Dragnet-inspired "tum-ta-tum-tum" for Tums antacid. At its peak in the 1990s the firm had 350 employees and $500 million in annual billings. He and his partners sold Jordan McGrath to the French advertising firm Havas in 1999.

Case established the advocacy ad group Avenging Angels in 2002, creating ads for liberal causes such as those that supported a ban on assault weapons, opposed the war in Iraq, sought to stem nuclear proliferation and for the Hudson River advocacy group Riverkeeper. He told The New York Times that he was glad that he had made the shift back to issue advertising, saying "I've never been so productive, so happy — and so poor." Anti-Iraq War ads that Case had developed featuring Janeane Garofalo and Susan Sarandon in February 2003 were rejected by the major U.S. broadcast networks which said that they don't accept advocacy ads.

Case died in Manhattan at age 72 on September 9, 2010, due to a heart attack. He was survived by his third wife and their daughter, a daughter and two sons from his first marriage, a son from his second marriage and nine grandchildren.
