= Joe Slade White =

American political strategist and consultant

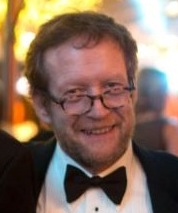
- Joe Slade White in 2013
- Born: March 8, 1950; Carroll, Iowa, U.S.
- Died: May 5, 2021 (aged 71)
- Education: Georgetown University
- Occupations: Political strategist and consultant
- Political party: Democratic
- Website: Joe Slade White

Joe Slade White (March 8, 1950 – May 5, 2021) was an American political strategist and media consultant. On April 4, 2014, White was named "National Democratic Strategist of the Year" by the American Association of Political Consultants. White's past clients have included presidential candidates, U.S. Senators, governors, members of Congress, and mayors, as well as statewide and local initiatives throughout the country. In 2013, The New York Times described White as then-Vice President Joe Biden's "long-time strategist."

== Career ==
At the age of 21, White was hired by the 1972 presidential campaign of U.S. Senator George McGovern, joining the campaign's traveling staff and finding a place on President Richard Nixon's "White House Enemies List." White worked briefly as a press secretary to McGovern.

When he was 23, White launched his own political consulting firm and was mentored by famed admaker Tony Schwartz. White worked to elect the first Native American to the United States Senate, the first woman Attorney General and Governor of Michigan, and worked on the first campaign in the nation to defeat a ban on bilingual education for Hispanic children. He has also served as an advisor and created television advertisements for Vice President Joe Biden, T. Boone Pickens, Michigan Governor Jennifer Granholm, General Wesley Clark, U.S. Senator Ben Nighthorse Campbell, Speaker of the House Tip O'Neill, AT&T and others. A number of his television campaigns have won national recognition. The American Association of Political Consultants has recognized White's television work with more "Pollie Awards" than they have bestowed on any of his Democratic peers. The 1989 book 30-Second Politics states that White produced the "first truly wordless ad" for a successful gubernatorial campaign in Oregon.

In 2010, White served as media strategist for Illinois Governor Pat Quinn's campaign, which was named by RealClearPolitics.com as the #5 upset in the country. In 2012, White helped elect the only Democratic female governor in the country, New Hampshire Governor Maggie Hassan.

== Personal life and education ==
White was born and raised in Carroll, Iowa. He resided in East Aurora, New York. He had five children. He was a graduate of Georgetown University in Washington D.C.
