= Stanley R. Lee =

American novelist

Stanley R. Lee (November 6, 1928 – July 15, 1997) was an advertising executive who wrote the novels Dunn's Conundrum (1985) and The God Project (1990) under the name "Stan Lee". He was copywriter for the notorious political commercial "Daisy" for the advertising firm DDB Worldwide and worked his way up to Senior Vice President of that company before being laid off in 1974.
