= Tony Schwartz (sound archivist) =

American media consultant and theorist (1923–2008)

- Born: Anthony Schwartz; August 19, 1923; New York City, New York, US
- Died: June 15, 2008 (aged 84); New York City, New York, US
- Website: tonyschwartz.org

Tony Schwartz (August 19, 1923 – June 15, 2008) was an American sound archivist, sound designer, media theorist, and advertising creator. Known as the "wizard of sound", he is best known for his role in creating the controversial "Daisy" television advertisement for the 1964 Lyndon B. Johnson campaign.

== Life and career ==
Considered a guru of the newly emerging "electronic media" by Marshall McLuhan, Schwartz ushered in a new age of media study in the 1970s. His works anticipated the end of the print-based media age and pointed to a new electronic age of mass media.

Born in Manhattan, Schwartz was raised there briefly before his family moved to Peekskill, New York. At 16, he went blind for about six months. He had previously been interested in ham radio, and the incident focused him more on sound as did his lifelong agoraphobia.

He earned a degree in graphic design from the Pratt Institute and worked as a civilian artist for the United States Navy during World War II. He later earned honorary degrees from John Jay College, Emerson College, and Stonehill College.

Schwartz began recording ambient sounds, spoken word, and folk music, releasing many albums on Folkways Records and Columbia Records. One of his albums, New York Taxi Driver, was among the first 100 recordings inducted into the National Recording Registry. Schwartz produced and hosted the weekly radio programs Adventures in Sound (also known as Around New York) and Communications Journal from the 1950s to 1976 on WNYC and WBAI.

He transitioned into advertising work in 1958 when approached by Johnson and Johnson about creating ads for the company's baby powder products based on his previous work recording children. His resulting work is often credited as the first use of children's real voices in radio commercials as specially trained adults had always done such voice work in the past.

Briefly specializing in advertising using children, he soon broadened into general advertising, creating ads for such clients as Coca-Cola, American Airlines, Chrysler, American Cancer Society, and Kodak.

Schwartz subsequently shifted his advertising work toward political campaigns. While continuing to create product ads, he created thousands of political ads for such candidates as Lyndon Johnson, Jimmy Carter, Bill Clinton, Ted Kennedy, Hubert Humphrey, George McGovern, and Daniel Patrick Moynihan.

He also created the soundtrack for the 1973 Oscar-winning animated short Frank Film.

In a final transition in his career, he turned his energies toward social-awareness advertising which he was familiar with having created the first anti-smoking commercials for radio and television early in his career.

In the 1980s, he resumed these efforts, creating many anti-smoking commercials as well as media work for such causes as fire prevention, AIDS awareness, educational funding, and nuclear disarmament.

In 2007, Schwartz's entire body of work from 1947 to 1999, including field recordings and commercials, was acquired by the Library of Congress.

Schwartz's wife, Reenah Lurie Schwartz, often worked closely with him on scriptwriting. They were married in 1959 and had two children: Michaela Schwartz-Burridge and jazz saxophonist, Anton Schwartz.

Schwartz is featured prominently as a character in the play "Daisy" by Sean Devine about the creation of the Daisy Ad, which premiered in Seattle in 2016.

Tony Schwartz is famous for saying, "The best thing about radio is that people were born without earlids. You can't close your ears to it."

Schwartz was inducted into the Political Consultants Hall of Fame at the American Association of Political Consultants (AAPC) in the year 2000. Former Schwartz student Joe Slade White produced the tribute video.

== Discography ==
- 1, 2, 3 and a Zing Zing Zing (Folkways Records, 1953)
- New York 19 (Folkways, 1954)
- Millions of Musicians (Folkways, 1954)
- Nueva York: A Tape Documentary of Puerto Rican New Yorkers (Folkways, 1955)
- Exchange: Friendship Around The World Through Tape Exchange (Folkways, 1955)
- Sounds of My City: The Stories, Music and Sounds of the People of New York (Folkways, 1956)
- Music In The Streets (Folkways, 1957)
- Sound Effects, Volume One, City Sounds (Folkways, 1958)
- The World In My Mail Box (Folkways, 1958)
- An Actual Story in Sound of a Dog's Life (Folkways, 1958)
- The New York Taxi Driver (with Dwight Weist, Columbia Records, 1959)
- You're Stepping On My Shadow (Folkways, 1962)
- The Sound of the Family of Man (1965)
- Standing Here At The Present Time: A Sound Portrait of New York City (1965)
- The Educated Eye – II (1966)

== Bibliography ==
- The Responsive Chord (1973, 2017)
- Media: The Second God (1982)
