= William Bogert =

American actor (1936–2020)

- Born: January 25, 1936; New York City, New York, U.S.
- Died: January 12, 2020 (aged 83); New York City, New York, U.S.
- Other name: Bill Bogert
- Occupation: Actor
- Years active: 1953–2020
- Spouse: Eren Ozker (1977-1993) (her death)

William Bogert (January 25, 1936 – January 12, 2020) was an American character actor best known for his roles as Brandon Brindle on the TV series Small Wonder from 1985 to 1989, Kent Wallace, the host of Chappelle's Show's Frontline spoofs from 2003 to 2004, and as the titular character of the 1964 "Confessions of a Republican" ad. In 1964 he appeared onstage in the touring production of A Man For All Seasons.

== Career ==
Bogert's television guest appearances included Gilmore Girls, Hope & Faith, Chappelle's Show, Law & Order, Ed, Profiler, Spin City, 3rd Rock from the Sun, Melrose Place, Empty Nest, Mr. Belvedere, Growing Pains, Amen, The Wonder Years, Webster, Matlock, Trapper John, M.D., The Colbys, Benson, Knots Landing, Hart to Hart, The Greatest American Hero, Square Pegs, The Fall Guy, Hill Street Blues, Fantasy Island, The Incredible Hulk, M*A*S*H, Alice, The Facts of Life, The Jeffersons, Quincy, M.E., One Day at a Time, Barney Miller, Lou Grant, Eight Is Enough, Baretta, McMillan & Wife, Starsky & Hutch, Police Woman, Taxi, Columbo, The Mary Tyler Moore Show, and The Doctors.

Bogert played the neighbor Brandon Brindle in all four seasons of Small Wonder (1985–1989).

In 1964, Bogert starred in the "Confessions of a Republican" ad for Lyndon B. Johnson in the 1964 U.S. presidential election. Bogert was a lifelong Republican, which was a requirement for the casting. He appeared on Don Lemon's CNN news show on March 17, 2016, and also on Rachel Maddow Show on May 2, 2016, to comment on the relevance of the ad to the 2016 election.

In July 2016, during the convention that nominated Donald Trump as the Republican presidential candidate, Bogert appeared in a reprise of the ad. "He scares me," Bogert said in the ad, echoing his comments about Goldwater 52 years before.

== Personal life and death ==
Bogert was married to Eren Ozker, a puppeteer best known for her work with The Muppets, until her death in 1993 at age 44. Bogert himself died in New York on January 12, 2020, at age 83, 13 days before his 84th birthday..

== Filmography ==
- Death Wish (1974) – Fred Brown (uncredited)
- Dog Day Afternoon (1975) – TV Anchorman
- The Front (1976) – Parks
- The Sentinel (1977) – Man standing next to Jack at Poolside photo shoot (uncredited)
- Fire Sale (1977) – Insurance doctor,
- Heaven Can Wait (1978) – Lawson
- Almost Summer (1978) – Mr. Albrecht
- A Fire In The Sky (1978) TV movie - Wayne Lustus
- Centennial (1979) – William Bellamy
- Hero at Large (1980) – TV Moderator
- The Last Married Couple in America (1980) – Dancing Man at First Party
- Death Wish II (1982) – Fred Brown (uncredited)
- WarGames (1983) – Mr. Lightman
- Whatever It Takes (1986) – Timmy Shaughnessy
- Stewardess School (1986) – Roger Weidermeyer
- Walk Like a Man (1987) – A.J. 'Al' Brown
- Alexander and the Terrible, Horrible, No Good, Very Bad Day (1990) – Dentist
- A Perfect Murder (1998) – Harrington
- Backseat (2005) – Dad
- Tenure (2008) – Dean Leakey
- The Flying Scissors (2009) – Mr. Perkins
- Time Out of Mind (2014) – Mr. Potter
