= Popsicle =

Popsicle as a genericized trademark may refer to:

== Food ==
- Ice pop, a type of frozen snack on a stick
- Popsicle (brand), an ice pop brand in the U.S. and Canada

== Music ==
- Popsicle (band), a 1990s Swedish pop band
- Popsicle (album) by Diamond Nights, 2005
- The Popsicle, an EP by Zolof the Rock & Roll Destroyer, or the title song, 2004
- "Popsicle" (song), by Jan & Dean, 1963
- "Popsicle", a song by Kovas, 2007
- "Popsicle", a song by Talking Heads from Bonus Rarities and Outtakes, 2006
- Popsicle Records, an American record label founded by Jeffree Star

== Other uses ==
- M-K TE70-4S, nicknamed "Popsicle", a diesel locomotive
- Popsicle Peak, a mountain on Vancouver Island, British Columbia, Canada
- Picolé (footballer), José Manoel Ricardo (born 1956), Brazilian footballer due to the nickname "Popsicle"
