= Daisy (advertisement) =

1964 US presidential campaign advertisement

- Agency: Doyle Dane Bernbach; Tony Schwartz
- Client: Democratic National Committee; Lyndon B. Johnson 1964 presidential campaign
- Running time: 60 seconds
- Release date: September 7, 1964
- Country: United States

"Daisy", sometimes referred to as "Daisy Girl" or "Peace, Little Girl", is an American political advertisement that aired on television as part of Lyndon B. Johnson's 1964 presidential campaign. Though aired only once, it is considered one of the most important factors in Johnson's landslide victory over the Republican Party's candidate, Barry Goldwater, and a turning point in political and advertising history. A partnership between the Doyle Dane Bernbach agency and Tony Schwartz, the "Daisy" advertisement was designed to broadcast Johnson's anti-war and anti-nuclear positions. Goldwater was against the Nuclear Test Ban Treaty and suggested the use of low-yield nuclear weapons in the Vietnam War, if necessary. The Johnson campaign used Goldwater's speeches to imply he would wage a nuclear war.

The commercial begins with three-year-old Monique Corzilius standing in a meadow, picking the petals of a daisy as she counts from one to ten incorrectly. After she reaches "nine", she pauses, and a booming male voice is heard counting the numbers backward from "ten", in a manner similar to the start of a missile launch countdown. A zoom of the video still concentrates on the girl's right eye until her pupil fills the screen, which is then replaced by the flash and sound of a nuclear explosion. A voice-over by Johnson states emphatically:

These are the stakes: to make a world in which all of God's children can live, or to go into the dark. We must either love each other, or we must die.

The ad was pulled after its initial broadcast, but it continued to be replayed and analyzed by media, including the nightly news, talk shows, and news broadcasting agencies. The Johnson campaign was widely criticized for using the prospect of nuclear war, and implying that Goldwater would start one, to frighten voters. Several other Johnson campaign commercials would attack Goldwater without referring to him by name. Other campaigns have adopted and used the "Daisy" commercial since 1964.

== Background ==
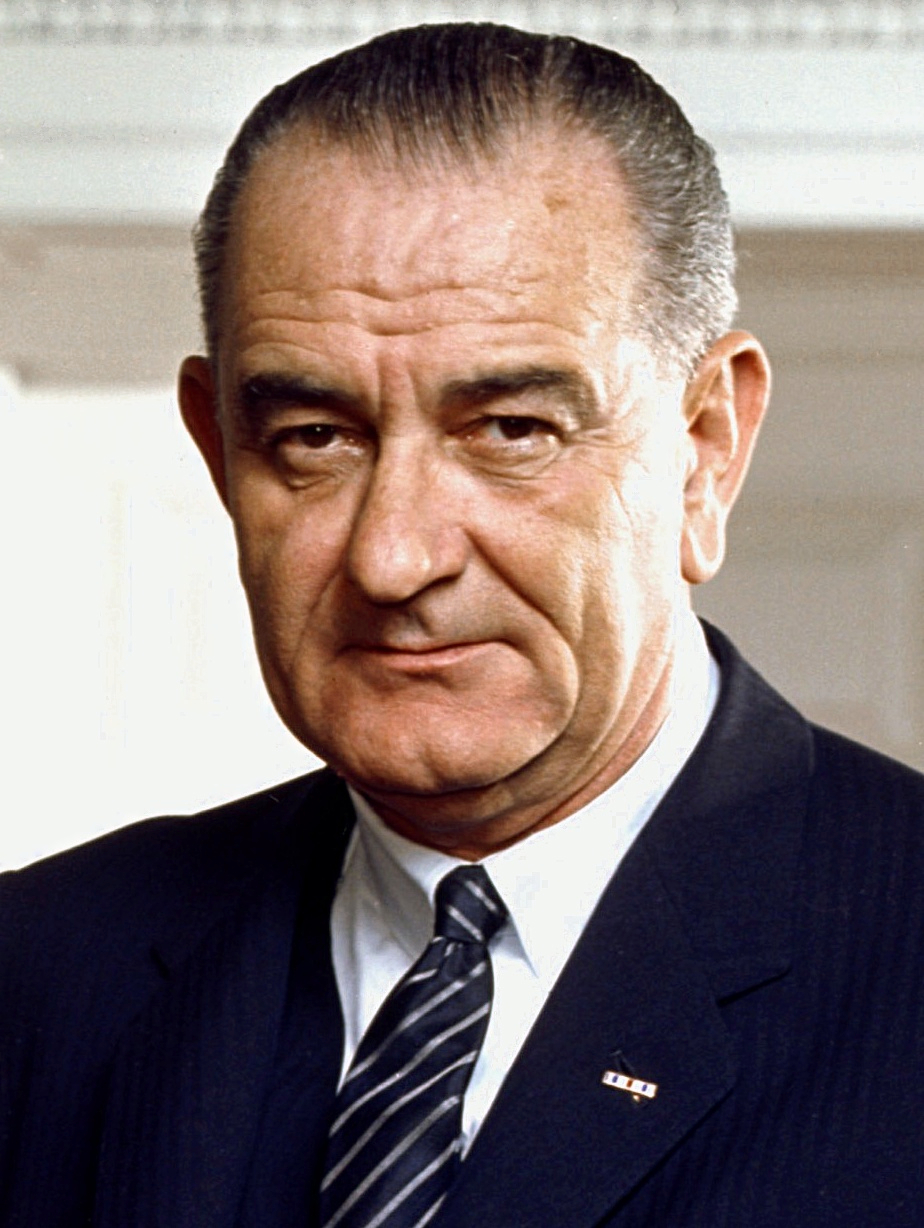
Lyndon B. Johnson's portrait, taken in December 1963

Following the assassination of his predecessor John F. Kennedy, Vice President Lyndon B. Johnson was sworn in as president of the United States in November 1963. Many saw Johnson as a ruthless politician effective at getting legislation passed. During his tenure as the Senate Democratic leader, he was referred to as "Master of the Senate". He often used rhetorical techniques, including the famous "Johnson Treatment", to gather votes in the Senate. In July 1964, he successfully urged Congress to pass the Civil Rights Act.

In the 1964 United States presidential election, the Republican presidential nominee Barry Goldwater challenged Johnson. In the aftermath of the Cuban Missile Crisis, nuclear war was one of the central issues of the campaign. A public opinion survey conducted in 1963 showed that 90 percent of the respondents believed that a nuclear war was possible, and 38 percent thought it was likely. The same year, Goldwater voted against the ratification of the Nuclear Test Ban Treaty, which eventually was passed by the Senate by a vote of 80–14. Goldwater campaigned on a right-wing message of cutting social programs and pursuing an aggressive military policy. Contrary to Johnson's policies, he suggested the use of nuclear weapons in the Vietnam War, if necessary. The Johnson campaign used Goldwater's speeches and his extreme political positions to imply he was willing to wage a nuclear war. They portrayed him as a dangerous extremist, notably mocking his campaign slogan "In your heart, you know he's right" with the counter-slogan "In your guts, you know he's nuts".

A public opinion survey in August showed that Johnson's accomplishments in office would likely yield him only limited support in the campaign. Goldwater ran an attack ad in which a group of children recited the Pledge of Allegiance until their voices are drowned out by Nikita Khrushchev, the then Soviet leader, proclaiming "We will bury you! Your children will be communists!" The Johnson campaign used several rhetorical techniques in the campaign. They emphasized Goldwater's extremism and the dangers of trusting him with the powers of the presidency. Jack Valenti, a special assistant to Johnson, suggested that "our main strength lies not so much in the for Johnson but in the against Goldwater" vote.

== Creation ==
Before 1964, campaign ads were almost always positive. The opposing candidate or their policies were rarely mentioned. In mid-June, John P. Roche, president of Americans for Democratic Action (ADA), a progressive advocacy group, wrote a letter to Bill Moyers, Johnson's press secretary, which said that Johnson was in a "wonderful strategic position", and that they could run a "savage assault" against Goldwater. He suggested that a billboard could be devised reading "Goldwater in 64—Hotwater in 65?" with a mushroom cloud in the background. Johnson agreed to devote considerable financial resources to an electronic media campaign—$3 million (equivalent to $31 million in 2025) for local radio advertisements, and another $1.7 million (equivalent to $18 million in 2025) for television network program advertisements. On July 10, the polls showed Johnson leading with 77 percent to Goldwater's 18 percent. By late July, Johnson's polling numbers had declined to 62 percent.

A partnership between the Doyle Dane Bernbach advertising agency (DDB) and Tony Schwartz, a sound designer and media consultant who was hired for the project, created the "Daisy" advertisement. The DDB team consisted of art director Sid Myers, producer Aaron Ehrlich, senior copywriter Stanley R. Lee, and junior copywriter Gene Case. The aim of the advertisement was to broadcast Johnson's anti-war and anti-nuclear positions. Schwartz based this concept on a previous public service announcement he created for the United Nations. DDB handled the casting and filming, while Schwartz managed the audio integration. Both Schwartz and the DDB team claim credit for the ad's visual elements, although their true creators are unclear.

== Synopsis ==
The advertisement begins with three-year-old Monique Corzilius, standing in a meadow in New York City's Highbridge Park picking petals off a daisy, counting from one to nine while birds chirp in the background. She makes several errors as she counts. When she was unable to count to ten successfully during filming, it was decided that her mistakes might be more appealing to the voters. After she reaches "nine", the girl pauses, as if trying to remember the next number. A booming male voice is heard counting the numbers backward from "ten" in a manner similar to the start of a missile launch countdown. Seemingly in response to the countdown, the girl turns her head toward a point off-screen, and the scene freezes.

As the countdown continues, a zoom of the video still focuses on the girl's right eye until her pupil fills the screen, eventually blacking it out as the countdown simultaneously reaches zero. A bright flash and thunderous sound of a nuclear explosion, featuring footage of a detonation, replaces the blackness. The scene cuts to footage of a mushroom cloud, and then to a final cut of a slowed close-up section of the incandescence in the nuclear explosion. A voice-over from Johnson plays over all three pieces of nuclear detonation footage, stating emphatically, "These are the stakes! To make a world in which all of God's children can live, or to go into the dark. We must either love each other, or we must die." At the end of the voice-over, the explosion footage is replaced by white letters on a black screen, written all in capitals, stating "Vote for President Johnson on November 3". A voice-over from Chris Schenkel reads the words on the screen, then adds "The stakes are too high for you to stay home."

== Broadcast, impact, and controversy ==
Extract from "September 1, 1939"

"All I have is a voice
To undo the folded lie,
The romantic lie in the brain
Of the sensual man-in-the-street
And the lie of Authority
Whose buildings grope the sky:
There is no such thing as the State
And no one exists alone;
Hunger allows no choice
To the citizen or the police;
We must love one another or die."

— W. H. Auden

DDB decided to broadcast the ad on Labor Day, when Johnson was supposed to begin his formal fall campaign. "Daisy" aired as a commercial only once, during a September 7, 1964, telecast of the film David and Bathsheba on The NBC Monday Movie. As the film is based on a biblical story, it is considered a family film and believed to be appropriate for the advertisement, as its audience would be one the Johnson campaign wanted to target. It was aired at 9:50 p.m. EST, in the belief that most of the young children would be asleep, leaving their parents watching the film. It was hoped that these parents would visualize their child in Corzilius's role. Unlike previous popular political advertisements and Goldwater's ads, "Daisy" is based entirely on striking imagery and sudden changes in visuals, the lack of music enhancing the sense of realism. Author Maureen Corrigan has noted that Johnson's line: "We must either love each other, or we must die" echoes line 88 of W. H. Auden's poem "September 1, 1939", which reads: "We must love one another or die." The words "children" and "the dark" are also found in the poem.

According to Press Secretary Moyers, the White House switchboard "lit up with calls" protesting the ad. Johnson called him and asked, "Jesus Christ, what in the world happened?" Though initially surprised by the protests, Johnson was later very pleased with the ad and wanted it to be broadcast again, but Moyers convinced him that this was a poor idea. Moyers later said that the ad "accomplished its purpose in one showing. To repeat it would have been pointless."

Initially, the commercial was referred to as "Peace, Little Girl". Even though Goldwater's name was not mentioned, many Republican politicians and supporters objected to the commercial. The same day, addressing his campaign rally in Detroit, Johnson said, "make no mistake, there's no such thing as a 'conventional nuclear weapon' ... To [use one] now is a political decision of the highest order. It would lead us down an uncertain path of blows and counter-blows whose outcome none may know."

The ad appeared in stories on the nightly news and conversation programs and was frequently replayed and analyzed by network news broadcasting agencies. Valenti suggested that broadcasting the ad just once was a calculated move. Lloyd Wright of the Democratic National Committee said later "we all realized it would create quite a reaction", adding in a subsequent interview that Johnson's campaign strategy was based on defining Goldwater as "too impulsive to trust with the nation's defense systems". Time magazine depicted Corzilius on the cover of its September 25 issue. The Johnson campaign was criticized widely for trying to frighten voters by implying Goldwater would start a nuclear war. Thruston B. Morton, a Republican senator from Kentucky, told the Senate on September 16 that the Democratic National Committee was putting "panic-inspired falsehoods" on television; and that President Johnson must take responsibility for them, adding the ad was aimed at "scaring the wits out of children in order to pressure their parents". Within days of its broadcast, it was referred to as one of the most popular and controversial television commercials. Fact magazine surveyed 12,000 psychiatrists, members of the American Psychiatric Association, asking whether Goldwater was "psychologically fit to serve as president of the United States". Approximately 1,800 replies were received, among which were many claiming Goldwater was a "dangerous lunatic" and "compensated schizophrenic". The publication of these results was controversial; Goldwater successfully sued and won $75,000 (equivalent to $694,000 in 2025) in punitive damages from Ralph Ginzburg, the magazine's publisher. This ultimately led to the American Psychiatric Association implementing the "Goldwater rule", which prohibits psychiatrists from disclosing their opinions on a public figure's mental health unless they have personally examined them and obtained their consent.

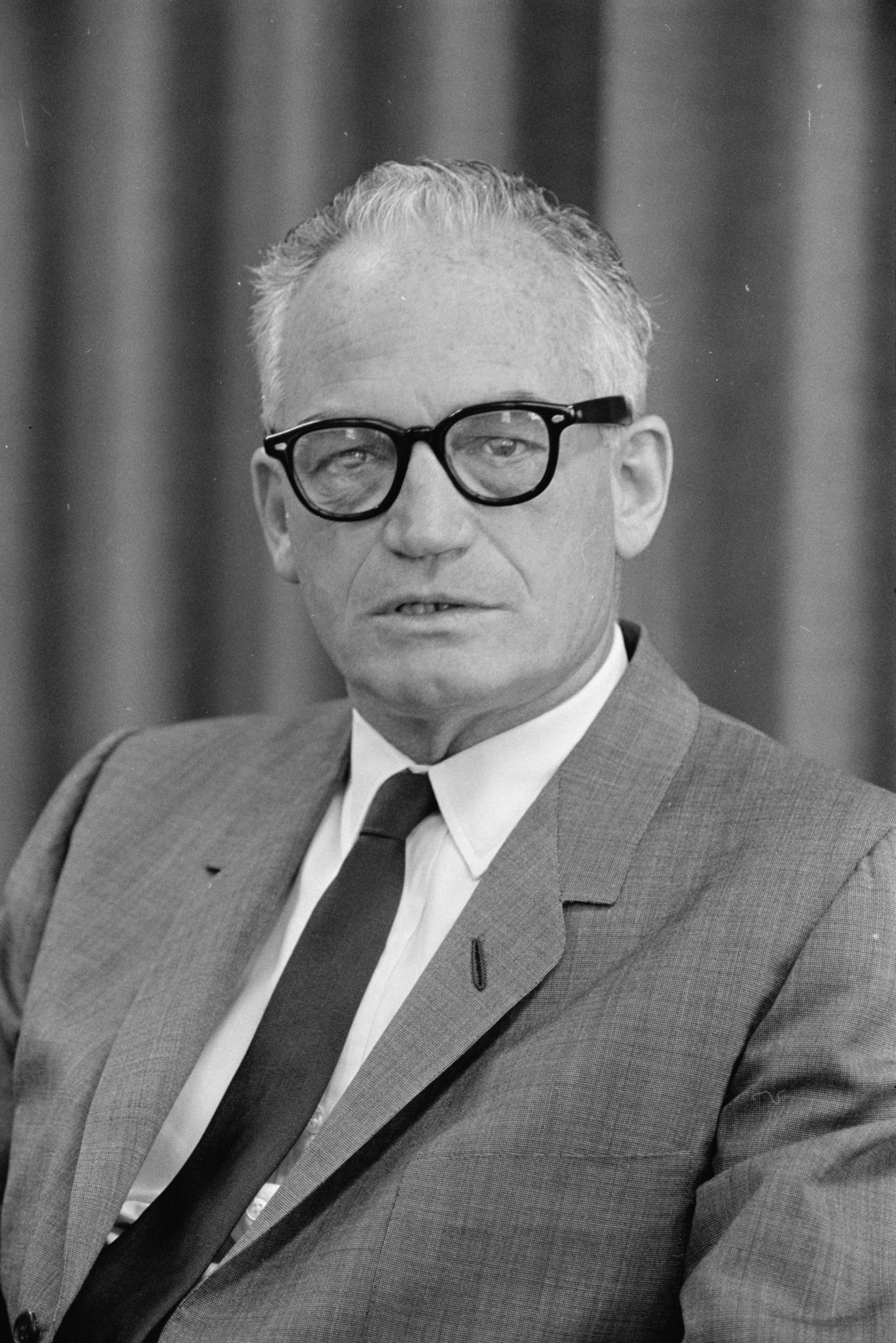
Barry Goldwater in September 1962

Nearly three weeks after its broadcast, Goldwater said that "the homes of America are horrified and the intelligence of Americans is insulted by weird television advertising by which this Administration threatens the end of the world unless all‐wise Lyndon is given the nation for his very own." In his subsequent speeches, Goldwater defended his views and insisted he wanted "peace through preparedness". In late September, he persuaded former president Dwight D. Eisenhower to appear in a filmed interview. He asked Eisenhower: "Our opponents are referring to us as warmongers, and I'd like to know what your opinion of that would be?" Eisenhower referred to Johnson's accusations as "actual tommyrot [nonsense]". Though the exact viewership of the commercial is unknown, Robert Mann, the author of the book Daisy Petals and Mushroom Clouds, estimates that approximately a hundred million people saw it. Mann said, "What one of the brilliant aspects of the daisy girl spot was they never mentioned Barry Goldwater, never showed his image, because they didn't need to. The audience already had a lot of information on Goldwater's reckless positions and statements on nuclear war and nuclear weapons ... they were trying to use what the voters already knew."

A few days later, the Johnson campaign released another advertisement, known as the "Ice-cream ad". The advertisement begins with a young girl eating ice-cream, while a female voice-over warns of the presence of radioactive isotopes like strontium-90 and caesium-137, which originate from atomic explosions, in the food. She discusses the Nuclear Test Ban Treaty, and Goldwater's positions against it, stating that if he is elected, "they might start testing [atomic bombs] all over again". The Johnson campaign ran further advertisements in a similar vein, including "Confessions of a Republican" and "Eastern Seaboard". A few days before the election, polls showed Johnson leading with 61 percent to Goldwater's 39 percent. Johnson won the election in a landslide victory, receiving 486 electoral votes to Goldwater's 52. Johnson received one of the largest margins of the popular vote in United States history, defeating Goldwater by almost 15 million votes (22.6 percent). As of the 2024 presidential election, Johnson has gained the highest share of the popular vote in a presidential election since it first became widespread in the 1824 election, and the "Daisy" ad is considered one of the most important factors in his landslide victory.

== Political usage and aftermath ==
The "Daisy" advertisement has been used or referenced in multiple political campaigns since first being shown and was an important turning point in political and advertising history. In his unsuccessful 1984 presidential campaign, Democratic nominee Walter Mondale created a commercial on secret communist nuclear weapons in space, which several newspapers compared with "Daisy" because Mondale's ad had a similar nuclear theme. In his unsuccessful 1996 presidential campaign, Republican nominee Bob Dole used a short clip of "Daisy" in his "The Threat" commercial; during the piece, a voice-over emphatically states "Thirty years ago, the biggest threat to her [the 'Daisy' girl] was nuclear war. Today, the threat is drugs." Other uses of "Daisy" include the 2007 Australian federal election, where the Australian Greens re-made it as one of their campaign ads on climate change. "Daisy" was also re-made in 2010 by the American Values Network, to encourage voters to ask their senators to ratify the New START program. Robert Mann concluded that "DDB brought to politics the same approach it applied to advertising automobiles, soap, and other products. In that way, 'Daisy' Girl helped usher political advertising into the modern era." In August 2026, the American Principles Project released an AI-generated remake of the advertisement, ending with candidate James Talarico performing gender-affirming surgery on "Daisy", in support of Ken Paxton in the United States Senate election in Texas. The Talarico campaign responded stating that "this AI deep fake ad is flat out lying".

Corzilius became known publicly as the "Daisy" girl after the broadcast of the commercial, although she did not see the commercial herself until the 2000s, when she searched for it on the Internet. Another child actor, Birgitte Olsen, falsely claimed that she was the girl in the commercial. While campaigning for the 2016 presidential election, Democratic nominee Hillary Clinton enlisted Corzilius to appear in a sequel to the ad that argued that Donald Trump was not competent to control nuclear weapons. In the ad Corzilius said, "The fear of nuclear war that we had as children, I never thought our children would ever have to deal with that again. And to see that coming forward in this election is really scary."

Almost 25 years after the commercial was first broadcast, when asked whether he approved of the "Daisy" commercial, Bill Moyers said:

Yes I did, and I regret that we were in on the first wave of the future. The ad was intended to remind voters of Johnson's prudence; it wasn't meant to make you think Barry Goldwater was a warmonger – but that's how a lot of people interpreted it. If my memory serves me correctly, we never touched on Vietnam in any of the political spots. It haunts me all this time that Johnson was portrayed as the peacemaker in that campaign, but he committed the country to a long, bloody war in Vietnam.

== See also ==
- Comparative advertising
- Fearmongering

== Works cited ==
- Guide to U.S. Elections. Sage. 2009. ISBN 978-1-60426-536-1.
- Altschuler, Bruce E. (1990). LBJ and the Polls. University of Florida Press. ISBN 978-0-8130-1894-2. OL 1876555M.
- Bates, Stephen; Diamond, Edwin (1992). The Spot: The Rise of Political Advertising on Television. MIT Press. ISBN 978-0-262-54065-0.
- Bump, Allison (2014). "Peace, Love, and Nuclear Explosions". Iowa Journal of Cultural Studies. University of Iowa. Archived from the original on August 11, 2021.
- Christiansen, Paul (2018). "Daisies for Peace – 1964". Orchestrating Public Opinion – How Music Persuades in Television Political Ads for US Presidential Campaigns, 1952–2016. Amsterdam University Press. pp. 56–62. ISBN 978-90-485-3167-7. JSTOR j.ctv8pzcv5.8. Archived from the original on August 10, 2021.
- Dallek, Robert (2004). Lyndon B. Johnson : Portrait of a President. Oxford University Press. ISBN 978-0-19-515920-2. LCCN 2003011360. OL 26362769M.
- Donaldson, Gary (2003). Liberalism's Last Hurrah The Presidential Campaign of 1964. M. E. Sharpe. ISBN 978-0-7656-1119-2. LCCN 2002029207. OL 3562380M.
- Hess, Stephen (1980). "Does Foreign Policy Really Matter?". The Wilson Quarterly. Vol. 4, no. 1. pp. 96–112. JSTOR 40255755.
- Jost, John T.; Stern, Chadly; Rule, Nicholas O.; Sterling, Joanna (2017). "The Politics of Fear – Is There an Ideological Asymmetry In Existential Motivation?" (PDF). Social Cognition. 35 (4). Guilford Press: 327. doi:10.1521/soco.2017.35.4.324. S2CID 53582796. Archived (PDF) from the original on August 17, 2021.
- Kavanagh, Dennis (1995). Election Campaigning – The New Marketing of Politics. Wiley-Blackwell. ISBN 978-0-631-19811-6. LCCN 94048275. OL 1121507M.
- Kearns, Doris (1976). "Lyndon Johnson's Political Personality". Political Science Quarterly. 91 (3). Academy of Political Science: 385–409. doi:10.2307/2148933. JSTOR 2148933.
- Kroll, Jerome; Pouncey, Claire (2016). "The Ethics of APA's Goldwater Rule". Journal of the American Academy of Psychiatry and the Law. 44 (2): 226–235. ISSN 1093-6793. PMID 27236179.
- Lerner, Mitchell (1995). "Vietnam and the 1964 Election: A Defense of Lyndon Johnson". Presidential Studies Quarterly. 25 (4). Center for Congressional and Presidential Studies: 751–766. JSTOR 27551510.
- Marshall, P. David (1997). Celebrity and Power – Fame in Contemporary Culture. University of Minnesota Press. ISBN 978-0-8166-2725-7. LCCN 96031522. OL 993025M.
- Newman, Bruce I. (1999). Handbook of Political Marketing. SAGE Publications. ISBN 978-0-7619-1109-8. LCCN 99006226. OL 16949539M.
- Mann, Robert (2011). Daisy Petals and Mushroom Clouds: LBJ, Barry Goldwater, and the Ad That Changed American Politics. Louisiana State University Press. ISBN 978-0-8071-4293-6.
- Taylor, Charles (1992). Sources of the Self – The Making of the Modern Identity. Cambridge University Press. ISBN 978-0-521-42949-8.
- Twitchell, James (2000). Twenty Ads That Shook the World. Crown Publishing Group. pp. 154–161. ISBN 978-0-609-60563-9. LCCN 99042477. OL 7585663M.
