= Lyndon B. Johnson 1964 presidential campaign =

American political campaign

Lyndon B. Johnson for President 1964
- Campaign: 1964 Democratic primaries 1964 U.S. presidential election
- Candidate: Lyndon B. Johnson; 36th President of the United States (1963–1969); Hubert Humphrey; U.S. Senator from Minnesota (1949–1964)
- Affiliation: Democratic Party
- Status: Official nominee: August 27, 1964; Won election: November 3, 1964; Certification: January 6, 1965; Inaugurated: January 20, 1965
- Key people: Oliver Quayle (pollster)
- Slogan(s): All the way with LBJ; LBJ for the USA; The Stakes Are Too High For You To Stay Home
- Theme song: Hello, Lyndon!

The 1964 presidential campaign of Lyndon B. Johnson was a successful campaign for Johnson and his running mate Hubert Humphrey for their election as president and vice president of the United States. They defeated Republican presidential nominee Barry Goldwater and vice presidential nominee William Miller. Johnson, a Democrat and former vice president under John F. Kennedy was inaugurated as president upon Kennedy's assassination. In 1964, Johnson did not look optimistically upon the prospect of being elected president in his own right. Despite Johnson's uncertainty about running, he was seen as the most likely candidate to get the nomination. He entered the primaries starting with New Hampshire and won the state by almost 29,000 votes. Johnson's main opponent in the primaries was Alabama Governor George Wallace, who had announced his intention to seek the presidency even before Kennedy's assassination.

Johnson did not campaign extensively for primaries, and his surrogates (stand-in candidates) continued to win many contests. By the end of the primaries, Johnson received 17.7% of the vote to Wallace's 10.8%. The 1964 Democratic National Convention convened at Boardwalk Hall in Atlantic City, New Jersey from August 24 to 27. With the opening of the convention, Johnson needed to decide on a running mate. He considered Hubert Humphrey, and Eugene McCarthy after the announcement that Robert F. Kennedy and the Cabinet were out of consideration. He felt that the presence of any member from Kennedy's family in the ticket would have raised questions about his capacity to win on his own. He finally selected Hubert Humphrey as the vice presidential nominee.

Major Republican contenders for presidency included Barry Goldwater, Nelson Rockefeller, Henry Cabot Lodge Jr., and William W. Scranton. Initially, Rockefeller was considered the front-runner, but Goldwater ultimately won the nomination with William Miller as his running mate. Johnson began his vote drive by a rally in Detroit. Appearing before a crowd of about 100,000 in Cadillac square, he said "no president of the United States can give up responsibility for deciding when or if to use nuclear weapons". Goldwater attacked Johnson for his policies, saying "the interim president has declared a moratorium on government. He desperately hopes to keep out of trouble if he does nothing until the election is over." The most famous and effective advertisement of Johnson campaign was the Daisy ad, which was aired in early September. Although it was aired only once on September 7, 1964, it is considered to be one of the most important factors in the campaign.

On election day, Johnson won a landslide winning 486 electoral votes and 61% of the popular vote to Goldwater's 38% of the popular vote, and 52 electoral votes. Johnson went from his victory in the 1964 election to launch the Great Society program at home, signing the Voting Rights Act of 1965 and starting the War on Poverty.

== Background ==
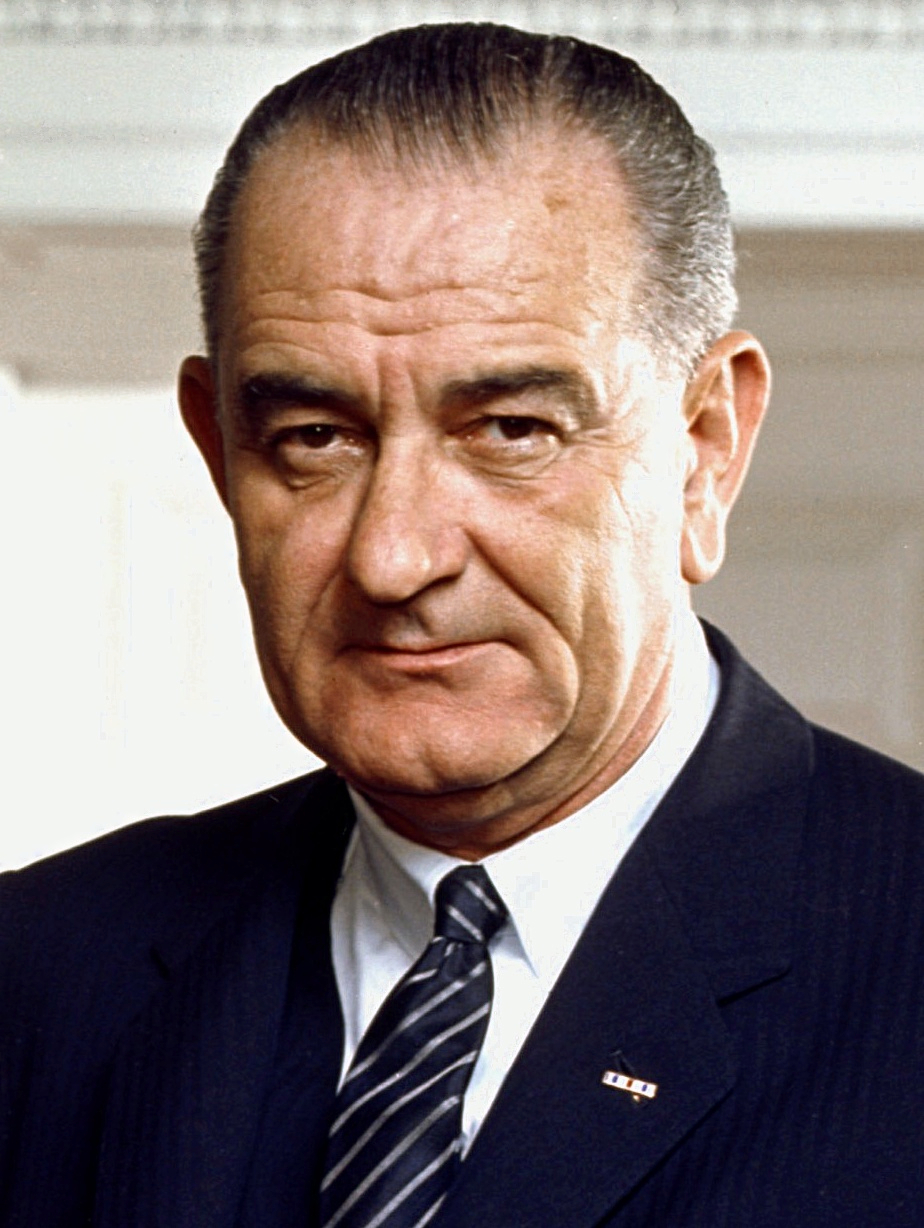
Lyndon B. Johnson

Lyndon B. Johnson was born in Stonewall, Texas in 1908. After graduating in 1930, he worked as a high school teacher. He was first elected to the House of Representatives in 1937 upon winning a special election for Texas's 10th congressional district. In 1948, he won the election to Senate from Texas, after narrowly winning the primaries. As a senator, he served as Senate Majority Whip and Senate Majority Leader. He campaigned for the presidential nomination in 1960 but lost the nomination to John F. Kennedy. He was selected as a vice-presidential candidate by Kennedy, and the Kennedy-Johnson ticket defeated the Nixon-Lodge ticket in the 1960 presidential election.

He was inaugurated as vice president in January 1961 and took on numerous minor diplomatic missions. In November 1963, while riding in a presidential motorcade through Dealey Plaza in Dallas, Texas, President Kennedy was assassinated. Johnson was quickly sworn in as president on Air Force One within a few hours of Kennedy's assassination. As president, Johnson retained senior Kennedy cabinet appointees including Kennedy's younger brother Robert F. Kennedy as Attorney General. Succeeding to the presidency just about a year before the 1964 presidential election, Johnson launched the War on Poverty and signed the Clean Air Act as early parts of his own agenda. Before the primaries begun, Johnson made use of his experience in legislative politics to help pass the Civil Rights Bill, which was passed by the House of Representatives on February 10, 1964.

== Gaining the nomination ==
=== Presidential primaries ===
In 1964, Johnson did not look optimistically upon the prospect of being elected president in his own right. In late March, pollster George Gallup told a White House aide that “the President is doing a fantastic job in polls". Except in the South, where Johnson had a 13 percent disapproval rating, he was leading throughout the country. Despite his lead, he believed that to assure his chances of victory in November, he needed to demonstrate that he was a President who could rise above politics to serve the national interest. Despite Johnson's uncertainty about running, he was seen as the most likely candidate to get the nomination. In early 1964, his wife Lady Bird Johnson insisted him to contest the primaries. His press secretary Pierre Salinger later opined that Johnson had decided to contest the primaries to prevent Robert F. Kennedy from becoming the president.

He entered the primaries starting with New Hampshire on March 10. There were no official candidates on the New Hampshire ballot, so both Kennedy and Johnson were write-in candidates.Some Kennedy supporters organized a Kennedy-for-vice-president write-in campaign, which gave him almost 25,000 voted for vice president. He had a four-to-one edge over Hubert Humphrey, his closest opponent. Johnson won New Hampshire with almost 29,000 votes, and Kennedy issued a statement that evening saying that the choice of a vice-presidential candidate should be made by Democratic convention in August, guided by the wishes of President Johnson. Shortly after the primary, Johnson began tossing out names of possible running mates. He initially considered Kennedy's relative Sargent Shriver, but eventually rejected the idea asserting that Shriver's presence on the ticket would still have raised questions about his capacity to win on his own.

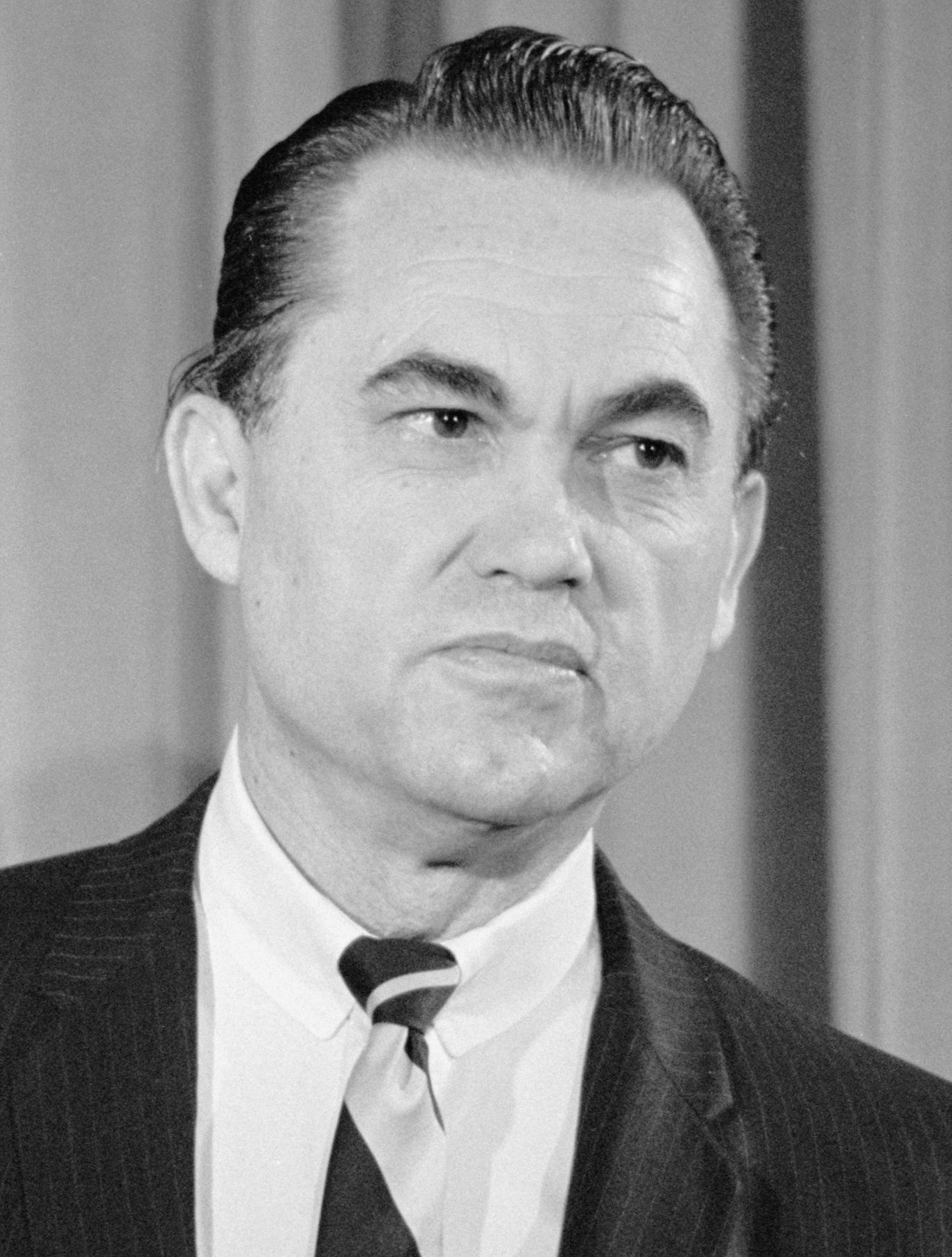
George Wallace

Johnson's main opponent in the primaries was Alabama Governor George Wallace, who had announced his intention to seek presidency even before Kennedy's assassination. With the Wisconsin primary approaching, Wallace entered the primaries. Upon his entrance, the Wisconsin press predicted that he would get almost 5% of the vote, which increased to 10% after a week. Wisconsin Governor John W. Reynolds told that it would be a catastrophe if Wallace received 100,000 votes. Wallace received 264,000 votes, almost one-third of the ballot cast in the primary, more than anyone anticipated. Reynolds, the stand-in candidate of Johnson won the primary.

Johnson's surrogates continued to win contests as George Wallace did not contest any primaries. Wallace next appeared on the ballot in Indiana against Indianan Governor Matthew E. Welsh, stand-in candidate of President Johnson. Wallace predicted that he would win the race in Indiana by any suitable margin, and tried to lure Welsh for a debate, but he refused. After Wallace's strong showing in Wisconsin, President Johnson insisted to help Welsh's campaign by providing money and administrative assistance. Wallace received about 30% of the vote to Welsh's 64%. Both the campaigns declared victory. Although Wallace did not have any delegate, but he asserted that his campaign in momentum.

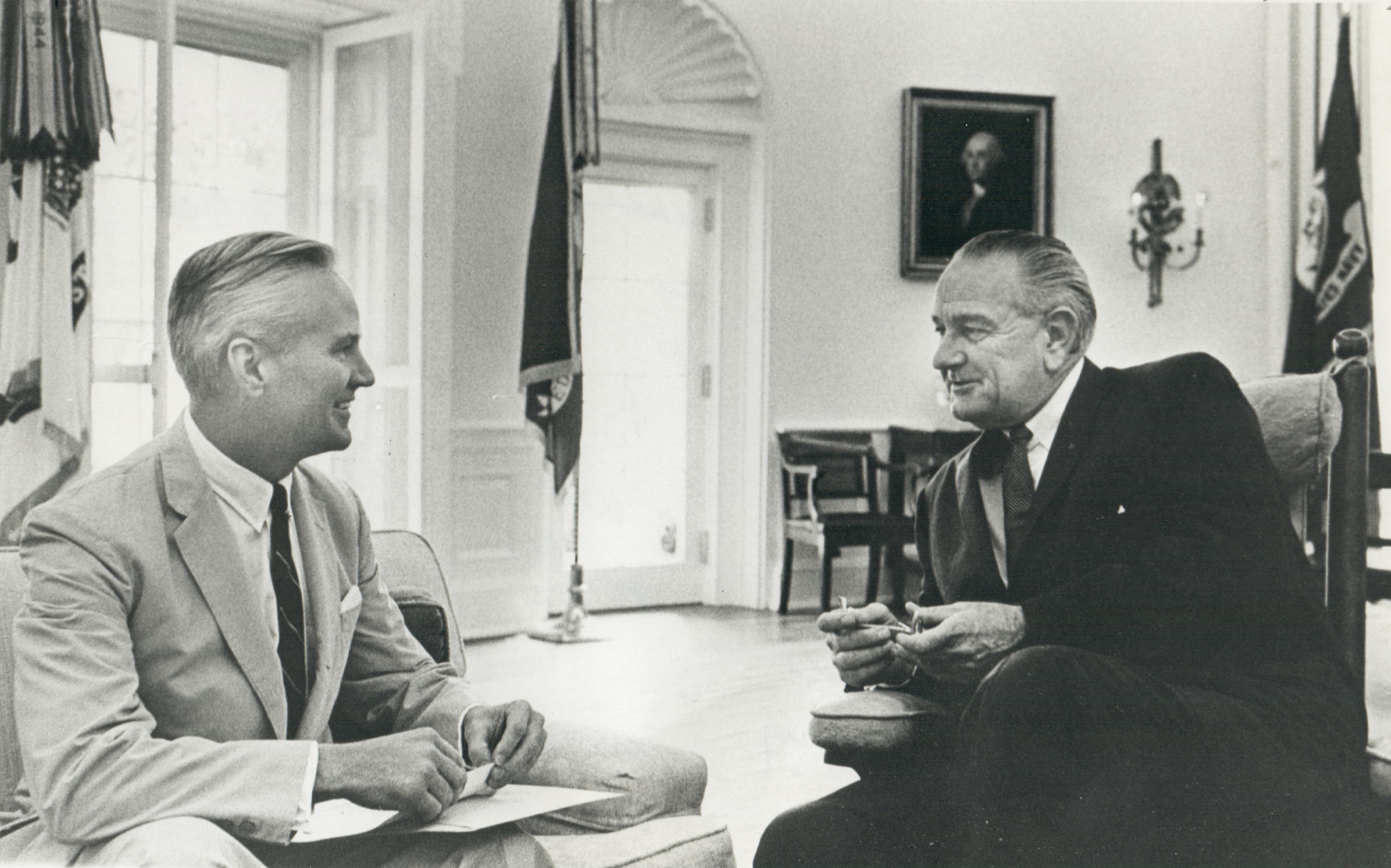
After Senator Daniel Brewster defeated Governor George Wallace in the Maryland presidential primary, President Johnson invited Brewster to the Oval Office to thank him for running as the President’s surrogate.

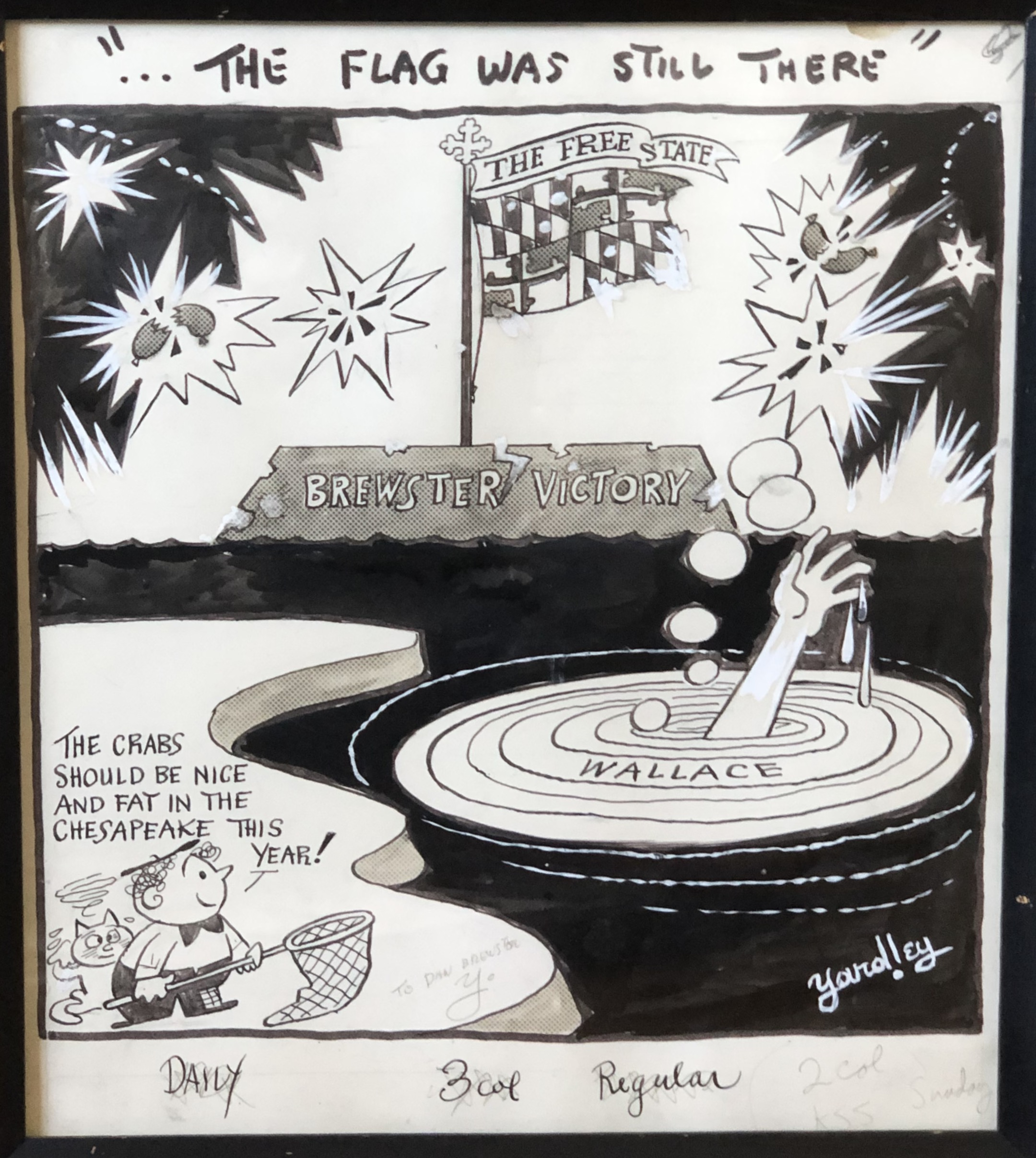
A political cartoon by Richard Yardley celebrating Daniel Brewster’s victory over George Wallace in the Maryland primary characterizes Wallace’s defeat with Fort McHenry as the backdrop.

The next major primary contest was in Maryland, where Wallace was a candidate. He faced Johnson's stand-in candidate Daniel Brewster, senator from Maryland. Many senators including Edward M. Kennedy, Birch Bayh, Frank Church, Daniel Inouye, Abraham Ribicoff, and popular former Baltimore Mayor Thomas D'Alesandro Jr. campaigned on behalf of Johnson. The Maryland primary drew the largest primary turnout in the state's history. Wallace received his biggest victory in Maryland, getting 43% of the vote to Brewster's 53%. Brewster said "I made a definite mistake. I underestimated my opposition.” By the end of the primaries, Johnson received the 17.7% of vote to Wallace's 10.8%. Most of the votes were of either unpledged delegated or Johnson's stand-in candidates. After the end of primaries, on June 19, 1964, the Senate passed Civil Rights Act with an amendment. The house agreed to the Senate amendment on July 2, and President Johnson signed the act into law the same day. Within a month, President authorized airstrikes against North Vietnam which was endorsed by eighty-five percent of Americans, with 71 percent saying they thought the United States was handling affairs in Vietnam as well as could be expected.

=== Democratic National Convention ===
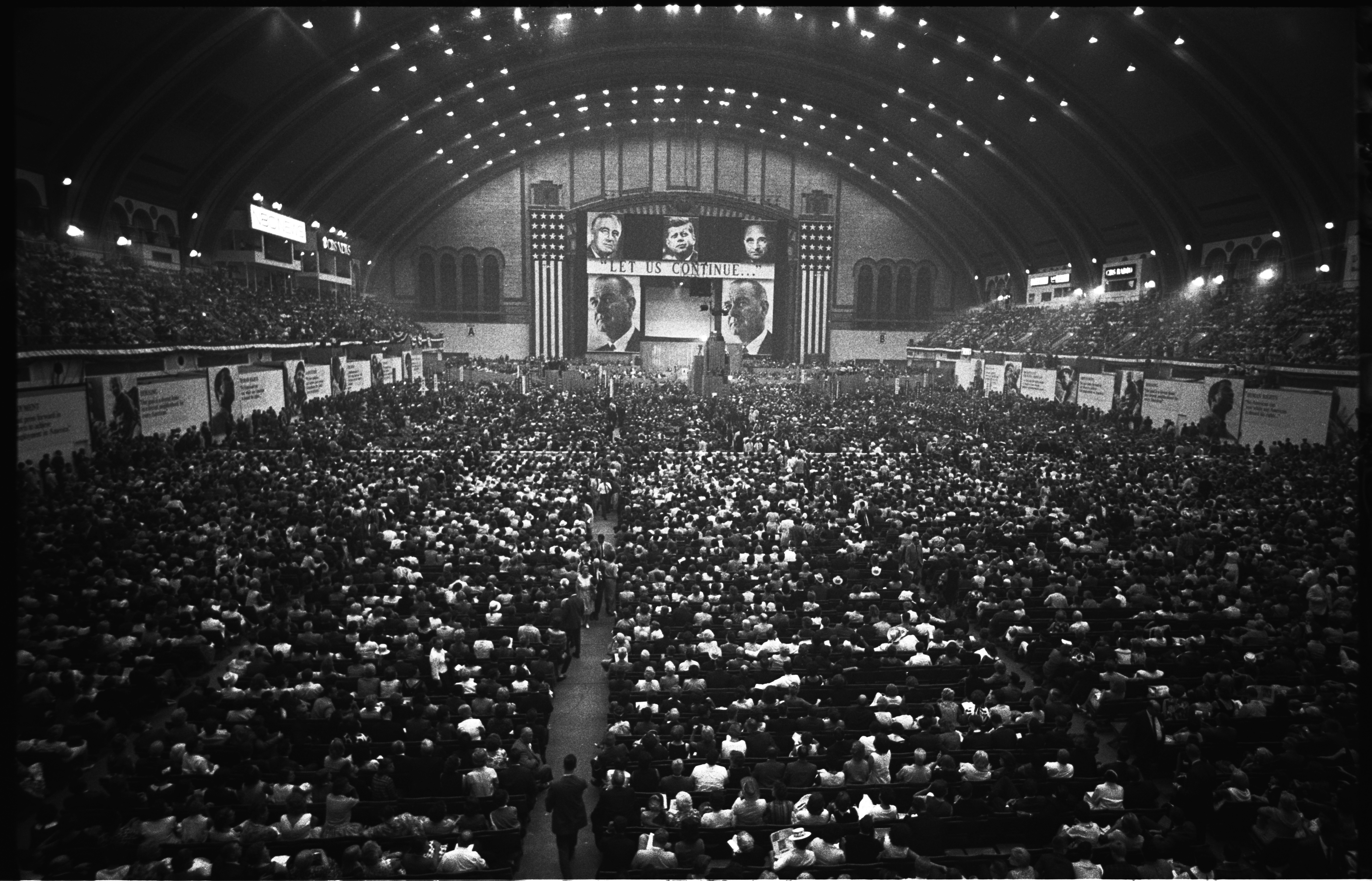
Aerial view of delegates and the stage of 1964 Democratic National Convention.

Lyndon B. Johnson's acceptance address.

The 1964 Democratic National Convention convened at Boardwalk Hall in Atlantic City, New Jersey from August 24 to 27. At the convention, the integrated Mississippi Freedom Democratic Party (MFDP) claimed the seats for delegates for Mississippi, because the official Mississippi delegation had been elected in violation of the party's rules as blacks had been systematically excluded from voting in the primaries. The credentials committee televised its proceedings, which allowed the nation to see and hear the testimony of the MFDP delegates, particularly the testimony of vice-chairperson Fannie Lou Hamer. Johnson was concerned that, while the regular Democrats of Mississippi would probably vote for Goldwater anyway, rejecting them would lose him the South. Eventually, Hubert Humphrey, Walter Reuther, and the black civil rights leaders including Roy Wilkins and Bayard Rustin worked out a compromise that two of the 68 MFDP delegates chosen by Johnson would be made at-large delegates and the remainder would be non-voting guests of the convention. This compromise was supported by Martin Luther King Jr., a civil rights activist.

With the opening of the convention on August 24, Johnson needed to decide on a running mate. He considered Hubert Humphrey, and Eugene McCarthy after the announcement that Robert F. Kennedy and the Cabinet were out of consideration He felt that Humphrey's presence on the ticket would give the country a competent vice president and would strengthen his electoral appeal in the Midwest and industrial Northeast. He even insisted their mutual friend Jim Rowe to ask Humphrey personal questions like "How much money do you owe and to whom do you owe it?". Johnson wanted to keep the vice presidential issue open until the last possible moment. Humphrey accepted the position believing that it would help him in becoming president in the future. While introducing Humphrey as his running mate to the convention, Johnson said "This is not a selection choice, this is not merely a way to balance the ticket, This is simply the best man in America for the job".

Johnson became concerned that Kennedy might use his scheduled speech at the convention to create a groundswell of emotion among the delegates to make him Johnson's running mate; he prevented this by scheduling Kennedy's speech on the last day of the convention. The closing day of the convention came on Johnson's 56th birthday. While accepting the nomination, Johnson said:

Because tonight the contest is the same that we have faced at every turning point in history. It is not between liberals and conservatives, it is not between party and party, or platform and platform. It is between courage and timidity. It is between those who have vision and those who see what can be, and those who want only to maintain the status quo.

== General election campaign ==
=== Getting an opponent ===
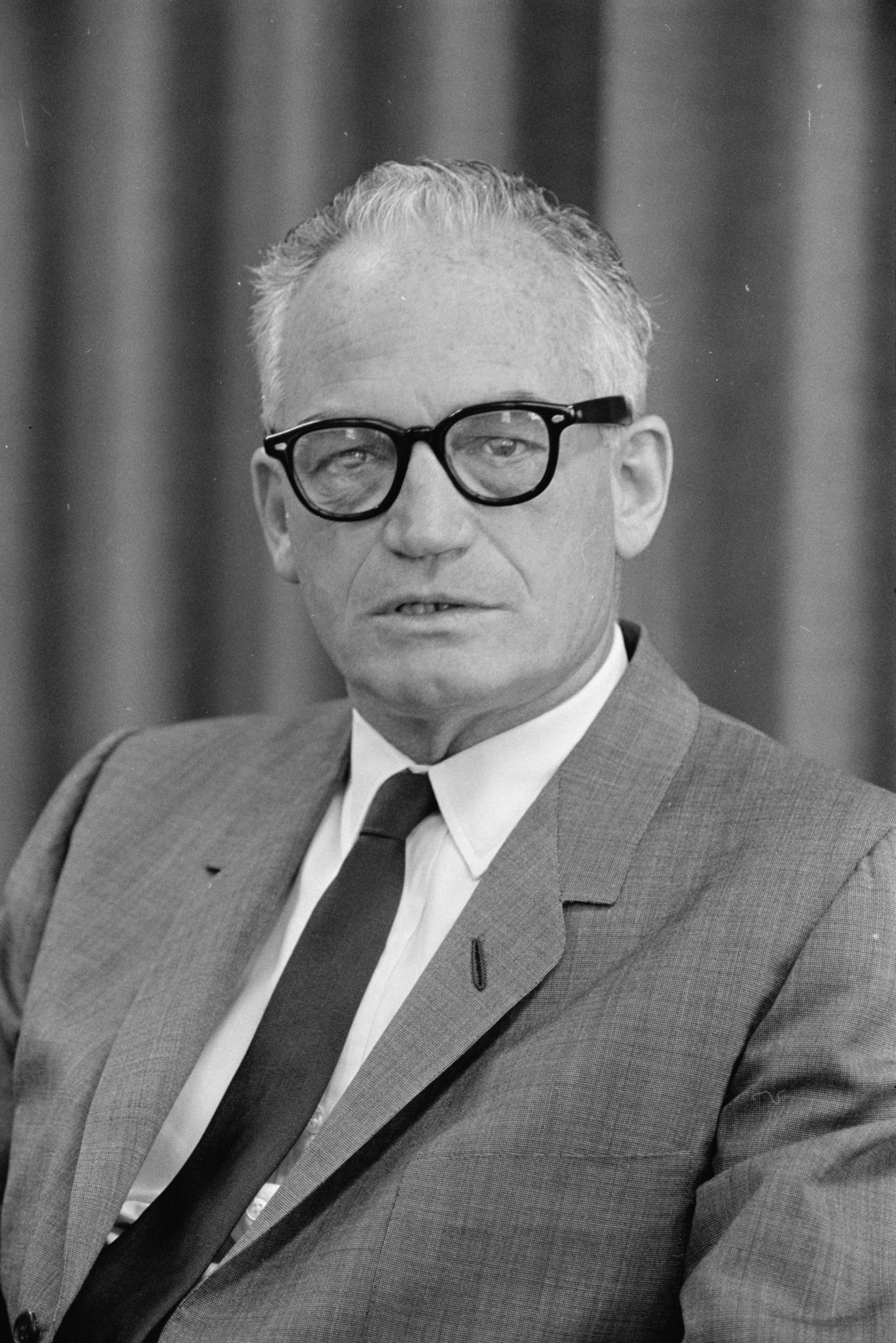
Barry Goldwater

Major Republican contenders for presidency included Barry Goldwater, Nelson Rockefeller, Henry Cabot Lodge Jr., and William W. Scranton. Initially, Rockefeller was considered the front-runner, ahead of Goldwater, but in New Hampshire, both Rockefeller and Goldwater were considered to be equally likely to win. Surprisingly, Ambassador to South Vietnam Henry Cabot Lodge Jr. won the primary with 35.5 percent as a write-in candidate, followed by Goldwater and Rockefeller.

Goldwater won many primaries including California, Texas, Florida, and Illinois. He flatly rejected President Johnson's foreign policy briefings, calling it "an offhand political gesture". Goldwater mathematically secured the nomination after winning an additional 56 delegates at the Texas Republican Convention in Dallas. His address to the convention drew 11,000 people to the Dallas Memorial Auditorium, where he proclaimed that it was essential for Republicans to win in the south, after years of "writing off" the region. At the Republican National Convention, he won the nomination on the first ballot with 883 delegates. He selected William E. Miller, U.S. Representative and chairman of the Republican National Committee, as his running mate for the general election.

In his speeches, Goldwater constantly implied that the Johnson administration was soft on communism and that the United States must carry the war into North Vietnam. He was opposed to the Civil Rights Act and voted against it in the Senate. He campaigned for reduced government expenditures, elimination of government bureaucracies, an end to “forced” integration, reassertion of states’ rights, and a total end of communism.

=== Campaign ===
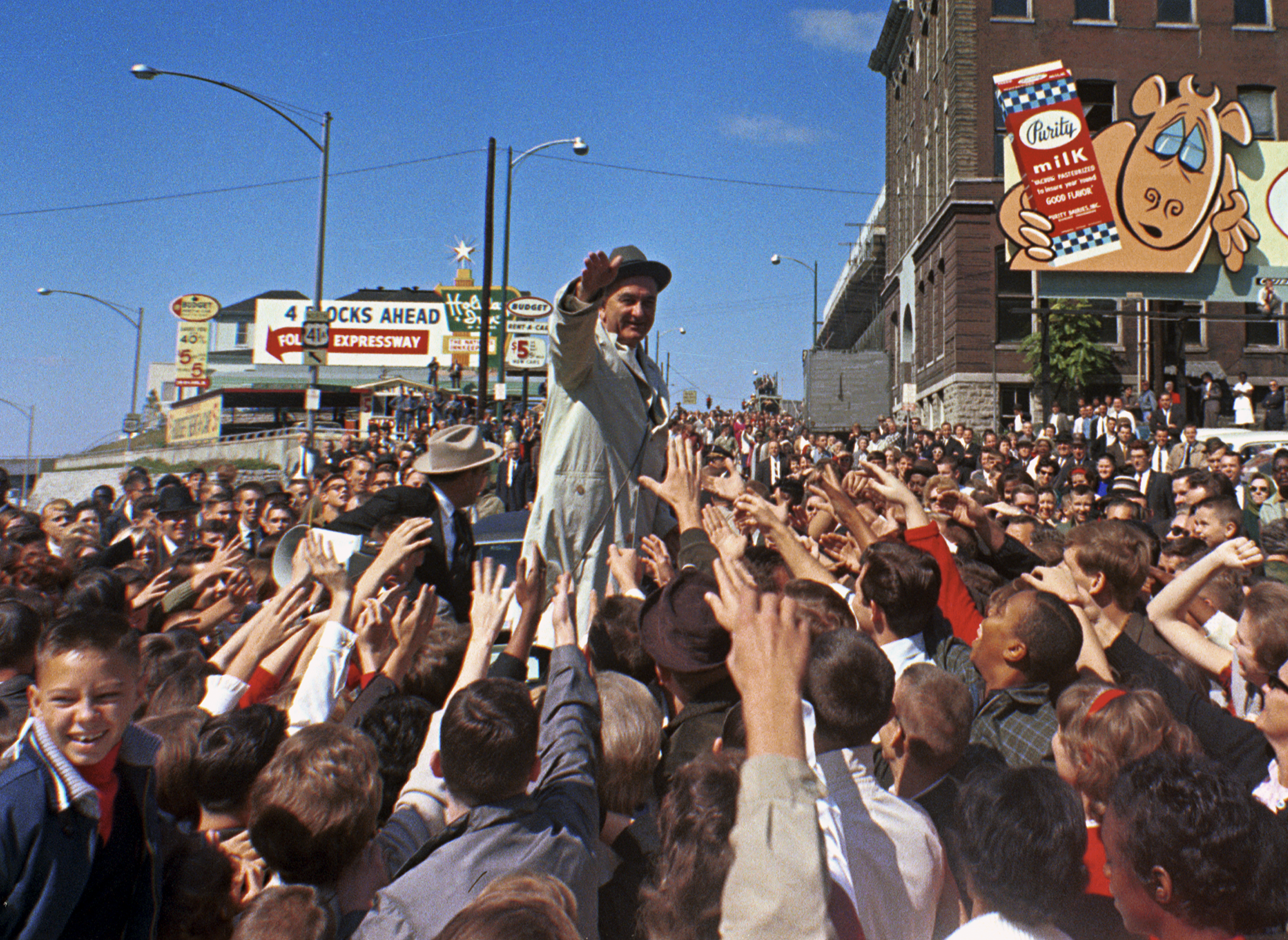
Johnson waving to crowd in a rally

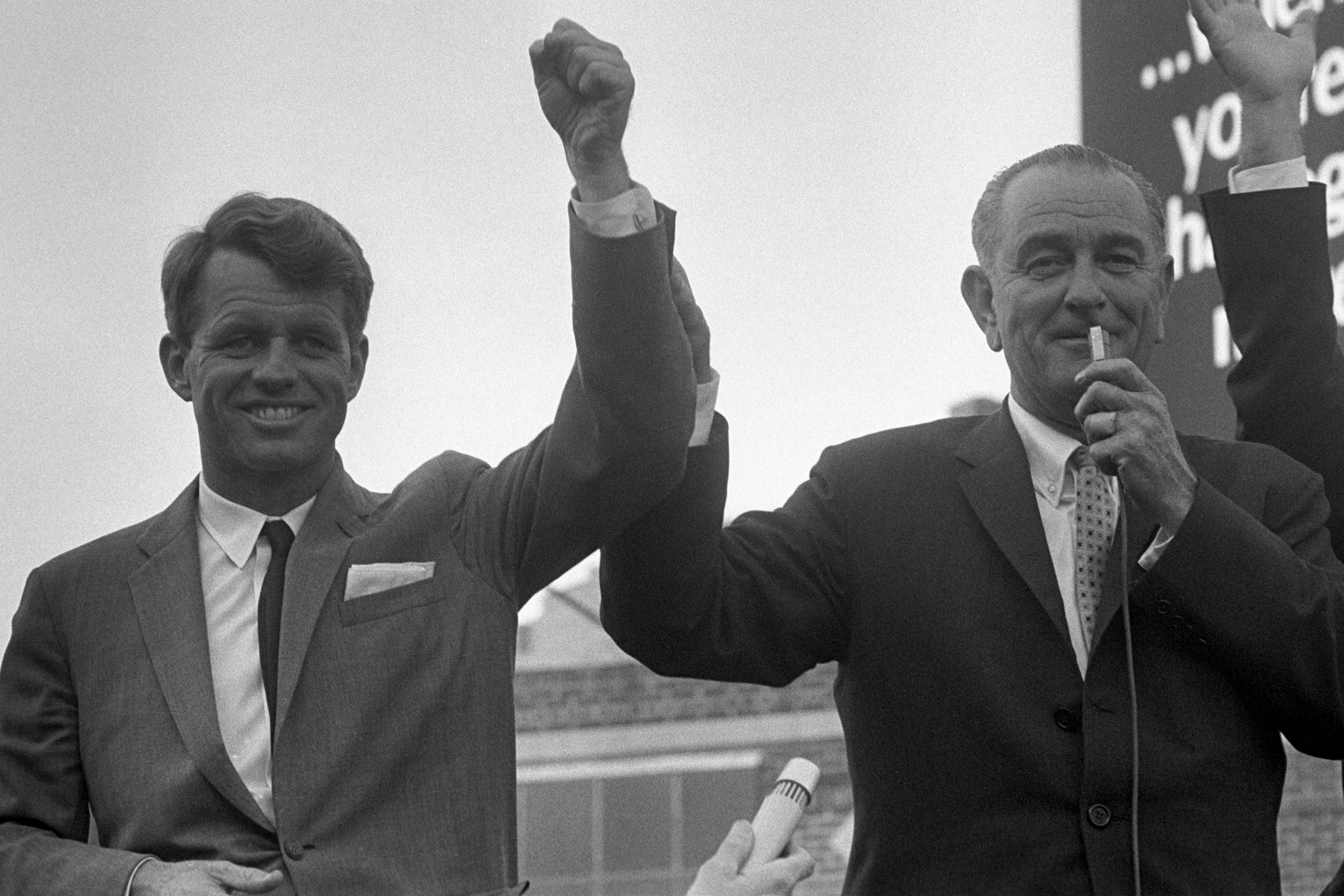
Johnson campaigning with Robert F. Kennedy

A day after the Democratic convention, President Johnson called Hubert Humphrey to his ranch in Texas for mapping their campaign strategy. Days after the convention, Kennedy left Johnson's cabinet to campaign for his Senate election from New York. Johnson began his vote drive with a rally in Detroit. Appearing before a crowd of about 100,000 in Cadillac square, he shouted "no president of the United States can give up responsibility for deciding when or if to use nuclear weapons", responding to Goldwater's request that the supreme commander of NATO be given his own stock of small tactical nuclear battlefield weapons.

Endorsements
- The New York Times (newspaper)
- The Trinity Tripod (newspaper)
- Montana Kaimin (newspaper)
- Life (magazine)
- International Association of Machinists and Aerospace Workers
- Ringo Starr (singer)
- Senator John L. McClellan (D-AR)

On September 9, during a rally in Harrisburg, Pennsylvania, President Johnson identified Republican cause as a doctrine that invites extremism and said that voters this year would reject echos of the past.

While campaigning, he visited Georgia and Florida, which were hit by Hurricane Dora. Johnson wanted and expected a landslide mandate from the people to carry on his policies. He considered the biggest problem to be the white backlash as Civil Rights Act had alienated the South, which Johnson had expected. Another problem that Johnson felt with his campaign was apathy, as most of his campaign staff anticipated an easy victory. His political consultant Ken O'Donnell said, "one of our greatest problems unquestionably is the sense of overconfidence, which leads to apathy in the field."

Goldwater attacked Johnson for his policies, saying "the interim president has declared a moratorium on government. He desperately hopes to keep out of trouble if he does nothing until election is over." Johnson's campaign reacted to this by their negative attacks on Goldwater. Democrats portrayed Goldwater as a dangerous extremist, most notably mocking the Republican slogan "In your heart, you know he's right" with the counter slogan "In Your Guts, You Know He is Nuts". Johnson used Goldwater's speeches to imply that he would willingly wage a nuclear war, quoting Goldwater: "by one impulse act you could press a button and wipe out 300 million people before sundown."

"Daisy" ad, a television commercial.

The most famous and effective advertisement was the Daisy ad, which was aired in early September. It depicted a young girl in the middle of a field plucking petals from a daisy. A voice in the background counted down from ten as she plucked. When the countdown reached zero, the camera zoomed in on her pupil reflecting a mushrooming atomic cloud. As the scene faded, Johnson's voice came on and he said “These are the stakes, to make a world in which all of God’s children can live, or go into the dark. We must love each other, or we must die.” Then the narrator's voice: “Vote for President Johnson on November 3. The stakes are too high for you to stay home." Even though Goldwater's name was not mentioned, the message was clear enough to generate a storm of Republican protests. Although it was aired only once on September 7, 1964, it is considered to be one of the most important factors in the campaign.

Opinion polls, blue denotes Johnson and red denotes Goldwater.

The opinion polls by Gallup showed President Johnson having a comfortable margin over Goldwater, with initial polls showing Goldwater at only 18% to Johnson's 77%. Though Johnson's polling numbers dropped in early July, he still had a decisive 2-1 margin over Goldwater. Johnson appointed Oliver Quayle as his campaign pollster, whom he had worked with in the 1960 campaign.

A poll coming to Johnson just a few days before the election showed him with a 64 percent to 36 percent lead. Although Goldwater demanded a presidential debate between him and the president, Johnson maintained a comfortable lead over Goldwater throughout that campaign that he never saw any need to confront, debate, or even address issues raised by him with much aggression.

The election campaign was disrupted for a week by the death of former president Herbert Hoover on October 20, 1964.

== Election day ==
1964 electoral college result.

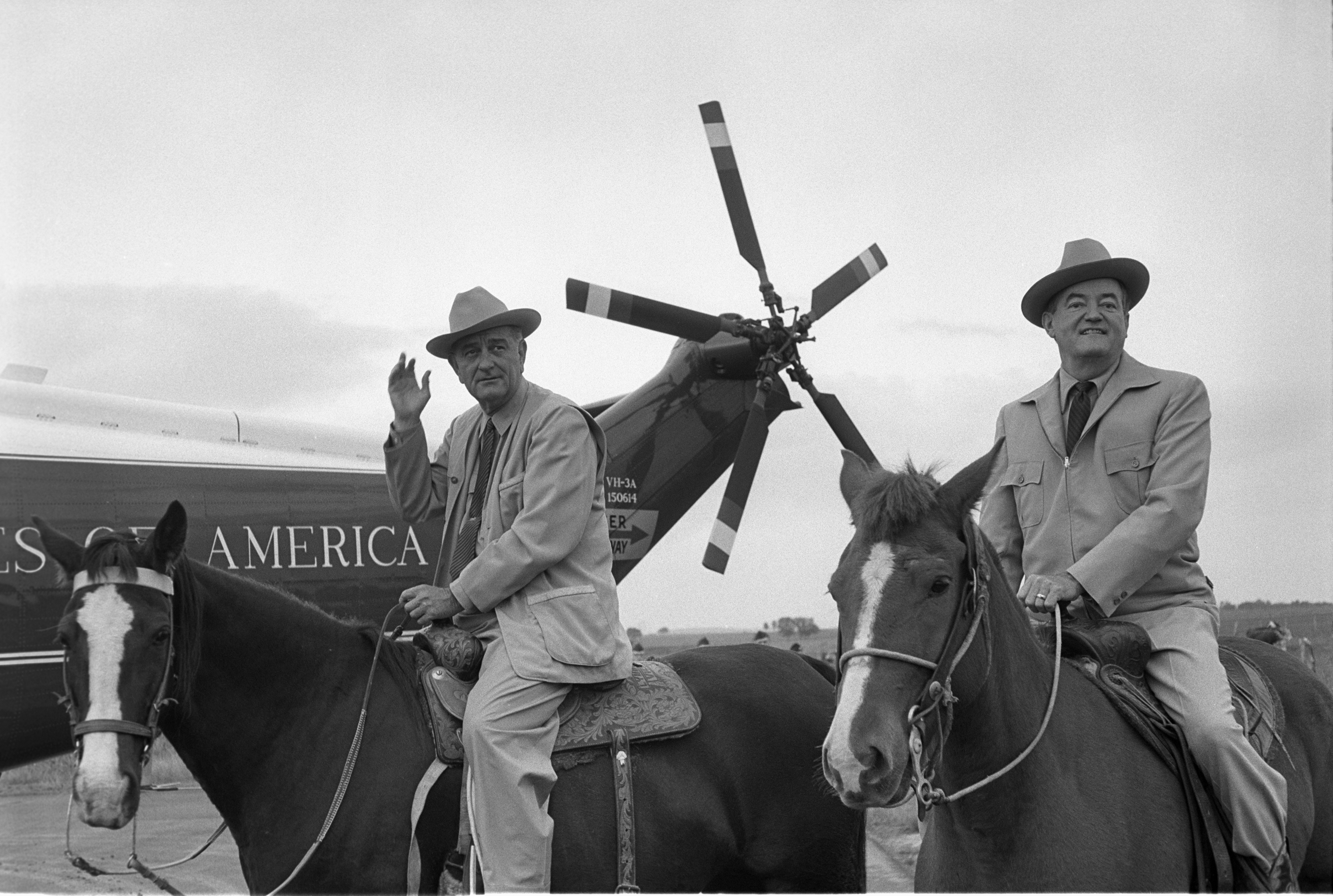
Johnson and Humphrey at Johnson's ranch after winning the election.

The election was held on November 3, 1964. Johnson defeated Goldwater in the general election in a landslide, winning over 61% of the popular vote, the highest percentage since the popular vote first became widespread in 1824. Goldwater won only his native state of Arizona and five Southern states.

The Johnson campaign broke two American election records previously held by Franklin Roosevelt: the most Electoral College votes won by a major-party candidate running for the White House for the first time (with 486 to the 472 won by Roosevelt in 1932) and the largest share of the popular vote under the current two-party competition (Roosevelt won 60.8% nationwide, Johnson 61.1%). This first-time electoral count was exceeded when Ronald Reagan won 489 votes in 1980. Johnson retains the highest percentage of the popular vote as of the 2024 presidential election.

The 1964 election was a major transition point for the South, and an important step in the process by which the Democrats' former "Solid South" became a Republican bastion. Nonetheless, Johnson still managed to eke out a bare popular majority of 51–49% (6.307 to 5.993 million) in the eleven former Confederate states.

Conversely, Johnson was the first Democrat ever to carry the state of Vermont in a Presidential election, and only the second Democrat, after Woodrow Wilson in 1912 when the Republican Party was divided, to carry Maine in the twentieth century. Maine and Vermont had been the only states that FDR had failed to carry during any of his four successful presidential bids.

The next day, Barry Goldwater conceded to President Johnson through a telegraph, congratulating him on his victory. He said:

I will help you in any way that I can toward achieving a growing and better America and a secure and dignified peace. The role of the Republican party will remain in that temper but it also remains the party of opposition when opposition is called for.

=== Results ===
Electoral results
Presidential candidate	Party	Home state	Popular vote		Electoral vote	Running mate		
Presidential candidate	Party	Home state	Count	Percentage	Electoral vote	Vice-presidential candidate	Home state	Electoral vote
Lyndon Baines Johnson (Incumbent)	Democratic	Texas	43,127,041	61.05%	486	Hubert Horatio Humphrey	Minnesota	486
Barry Morris Goldwater	Republican	Arizona	27,175,754	38.47%	52	William Edward Miller	New York	52
(Unpledged Electors)	Democratic	Alabama	210,732	0.30%	0		Alabama	0
Eric Hass	Socialist Labor	New York	45,189	0.06%	0	Henning A. Blomen	Massachusetts	0
Clifton DeBerry	Socialist Workers	Illinois	32,706	0.05%	0	Ed Shaw	Michigan	0
Earle Harold Munn	Prohibition	Michigan	23,267	0.03%	0	Mark R. Shaw	Massachusetts	0
John Kasper	States' Rights	New York	6,953	0.01%	0	J. B. Stoner	Georgia	0
Joseph B. Lightburn	Constitution	West Virginia	5,061	0.01%	0	Theodore Billings	Colorado	0
Other			12,581	0.02%	—	Other		—
Total			70,639,284	100%	538			538
Needed to win					270			270

Source (popular vote): Leip, David. "1964 Presidential Election Results". Dave Leip's Atlas of U.S. Presidential Elections.

Source (electoral vote): "Electoral College Box Scores 1789–1996". National Archives and Records Administration.

== Aftermath ==
Johnson went from his victory in the 1964 election to launch the Great Society program at home, signing the Voting Rights Act of 1965 and starting the War on Poverty. He also escalated the Vietnam War, which significantly reduced his popularity. As he had served less than 24 months of Kennedy's term, he was constitutionally permitted to run for a second full term in the 1968 presidential election under the Twenty-second Amendment to the United States Constitution. Initially, Eugene McCarthy of Minnesota challenged Johnson as an anti-war candidate, but soon after, Senator Robert F. Kennedy too challenged him. Johnson's internal polling showed his trailing to Kennedy. On March 31, 1968, Johnson shocked the nation when he announced he would not run for re-election by concluding with the line: "I shall not seek, and I will not accept, the nomination of my party for another term as your President." While campaigning, Kennedy was assassinated shortly after midnight at the Ambassador Hotel in Los Angeles. After Kennedy's assassination, the Democratic party nominated Vice president Hubert Humphrey as their presidential candidate. Humphrey later lost the presidential election to Republican former vice president Richard Nixon.

== See also ==
- Barry Goldwater 1964 presidential campaign
- John F. Kennedy 1960 presidential campaign
- Hubert Humphrey 1968 presidential campaign
- 1964 United States presidential election

== Sources and references ==
=== Books cited ===
- Altschuler, Bruce E. (1990). LBJ and the Polls. University Press of Florida. ISBN 978-0-8130-1894-2.
- Dallek, Robert (2004). Lyndon B. Johnson : Portrait of a President. Oxford University Press. ISBN 978-0-19-515920-2.
- Donaldson, Gary (2003). Liberalism's last Hurrah : The Presidential Campaign of 1964. M.E. Sharpe. ISBN 978-0-7656-1119-2. LCCN 2002029207.
- Lesher, Stephan (1994). George Wallace: American Populist. Hachette Books. ISBN 978-0-201-40798-3.
- Woods, Randal (2017). LBJ: Architect of American Ambition. Free Press. ISBN 978-1-4165-9331-7.
