= List of people with surname Brown =

Brown is a popular English-language surname derived from the color brown as a personal feature. This list provides links to biography of people who share this surname, organized by area of endeavor.

== Activism ==
- Curlee Brown Sr. (1909–1976), African-American activist
- Dominique Brown (1989 or 1990–2024), American social media influencer
- Eva Maria Brown (1856–1917), American social reformer, temperance activist
- H. Rap Brown (1943–2025), American civil rights activist
- Hallie Quinn Brown (1849–1949), African-American educator, writer, activist
- Hazel Brown (1942–2022), Trinbagonian women's and consumer rights activist
- LaVera Brown (1931–2017), African-American activist
- Olympia Brown (1835–1926), American women's suffragist
- Ymania Brown (1963–2025), Samoan LGBT rights activist

== Art and architecture ==
- Christy Brown (1932–1981), Irish author, painter and poet
- Dexter Brown (born 1942), British painter
- Ethel Isadore Brown (1872–1944), American painter
- Ford Madox Brown (1821–1893), English painter
- Hillary Brown, American architect
- Joan Brown (artist, born 1945), American artist
- Lancelot "Capability" Brown (1716–1783), English landscape gardener
- Mather Brown, American painter
- Neave Brown (1929–2018), American-born British architect
- Nyuju Stumpy Brown (1924–2011), Australian painter

== Business ==
- Bobbi Brown (born 1957), makeup artist and entrepreneur

== Crime and the law ==
- Christa Brown, American lawyer, author, and clergy sexual abuse victim advocate
- Justice Brown (disambiguation)
- Judge Brown (disambiguation)
- Kenyel Brown (1979–2020), American criminal
- Nixzmary Brown (1998–2006), American murder victim

== Engineering, science, and medicine ==
- Anthony Brown, Dutch astronomer
- Barnum Brown (1873–1963), American paleontologist
- Holly Brown-Borg American biologist and biogerontologist
- Janine Brown (born 1954), American reproductive biologist
- Jeannette Brown (born 1934), American organic medicinal chemist, historian, and author
- Lowell S. Brown (1934–2023), American physicist
- N. E. Brown (Nicholas Edward Brown, 1849–1934), botanist
- Ola Brown (born 1986), British-Nigerian physician
- R. Malcolm Brown Jr. (born 1939), American biologist
- Treva Brown, American chemist

== Film, television, and theater ==
- Alton Brown (born 1962), American TV chef
- Bille Brown (1952–2013), Australian actor and playwright
- Blair Brown (born 1946), American actress
- Bryan Brown (born 1947), Australian actor
- Candy Brown (born 1958), American actress and dancer
- Clancy Brown (born 1959), American actor
- Clarence Brown (1890–1987), American movie director
- Dionne Brown, British actress
- June Brown (1927–2022), English actress
- Kardea Brown (born 1987), American chef and television host
- Michel Brown (born 1976), Argentine actor
- Quinne Brown (born 1979), South African actress
- Samantha Brown (born 1970), Travel Channel host
- Tessica Brown (born 1980), American Internet celebrity known for putting Gorilla Glue in her hair
- Theo Wade Brown (1950–2002), British designer and eccentric, well-known member of the London special effects community
- Treg Brown (1899–1984), sound-effects editor for Warner Bros. Cartoons

== History, philosophy, and religion ==
- Jeannine Brown, American New Testament scholar
- Truesdell Sparhawk Brown (1906–1992), American historian of ancient Greece

== Literature ==
- Borsa Brown (born 1975), Hungarian novelist
- Dale Brown (born 1956), American novelist
- Hilary Brown (born 1946), Canadian journalist
- Lillian Brown (1914–2020), American writer, radio and television producer, educator, and make-up artist
- Loren G. Brown (1920–1996), American author
- Phoebe Hinsdale Brown (1783–1861), American hymnwriter
- Rita Mae Brown (born 1944), American writer and social activist
- Rollo Walter Brown (1880–1956), American writer and teacher of rhetoric
- Roseanne A. Brown (born 1995), Ghanaian-born American writer
- Rosel George Brown (1926–1967), American science fiction author
- Ticasuk Brown (1904–1982), Iñupiaq educator poet and writer

== Music ==
- Angie Brown (born 1963), British singer
- Ayla Brown (born 1988), American singer, college basketball player and former American Idol contestant
- Bobby Brown (born (1969), American singer, songwriter, rapper, and dancer
- Chastity Brown (born 1982), American singer-songwriter
- Earle Brown (1926–2002), American experimental composer
- Eban Brown (born 1972), American pop vocalist, lead singer of The Stylistics
- Gabriel Brown (1910–1972), American Piedmont blues singer and guitarist
- Iona Brown (1941–2004), British violinist and conductor
- Ivadell Brown, American musician and vocalist
- J. Harold Brown (died 1982), American composer
- James Brown (1933–2006), American singer, songwriter, dancer, musician, and record producer
- Jazbo Brown, Black Delta blues musician from around the transition of the 19th into the 20th century, whose existence is disputed
- Jewel Brown, American jazz and blues singer
- Jocelyn Brown (born 1950), American R&B and dance music singer
- Junior Brown (born 1952), American country singer
- Kane Brown (born 1993), American country music singer and songwriter
- Chris Brown (born 1989), American R&B singer
- Kenji Brown (born 1956), Japanese-American R&B musician, guitarist and lead vocalist of band Rose Royce
- Lew Brown (1893–1958), American lyricist
- Melanie Brown (born 1975), English pop singer
- Odell Brown (1940–2011), American jazz organist
- Pearly Brown (1915–1986), American musician
- Ruth Brown (1928–2006), American singer
- Tally Brown (1924–1989), American singer and actress
- Texas Johnny Brown (1928–2013), American blues guitarist, songwriter and singer
- Trisha Brown (1936–2017), American choreographer and dancer
- Vicki Brown (1940–1991), English singer
- The 5 Browns, classical piano musical group: Ryan, Melody, Gregory, Deondra, and Desirae

== Politics ==
=== Disambiguation ===
- Mayor Brown (disambiguation)
- Representative Brown (disambiguation)
- Senator Brown (disambiguation)

=== Canada ===
- Fergy Brown (1923–2013), Canadian politician
- Gord Brown (1960–2018), Canadian politician
- Jan Brown (born 1947), Canadian politician
- Levinia Brown (born 1947), Canadian politician
- Lois Brown (born 1955), Canadian politician

=== New Zealand ===
- Len Brown (born 1956), first mayor of Greater Auckland

=== United States ===
- A. Freeborn Brown (1915–1998), Maryland state delegate and lawyer
- Adon P. Brown (1873–1942), New York state senator
- Basil W. Brown (1927–1997), Michigan state senator
- Clarke W. Brown (died 1956), Michigan Secretary of State
- Cloria Brown (1942–2018), Missouri state representative
- Corrine Brown (born 1946), Florida Representative from 1993 to 2017 and convicted felon
- Donnie Brown, American politician
- Edward and Elaine Brown (born 1942 and c. 1940), New Hampshire tax protesters
- Elizabeth Childress Brown (1842–1919), First Lady of Tennessee
- Elon R. Brown (1857–1922), President pro tem of the New York State Senate 1915 until 1918
- Garfield W. Brown (1881–1967), American lawyer and Minnesota state representative
- Herschel Brown, American politician
- Karilyn Brown, Arkansan politician
- LaForest E. Brown (1858–1942), Minnesotan state senator
- Neal Brown (Wisconsin politician) (1861–1917), American politician
- Raleigh Brown (1921–2009), Texas House of Representatives and state judge
- Rufus E. Brown (1854–1920), Vermont politician and attorney general
- Sherrod Brown (born 1952), U.S. senator from Ohio
- Shontel Brown (born 1975), U.S. representative for Ohio's 11th congressional district

== Sports ==
- Alfredo Brown (1886–1958), Argentine association football player
- Ali Brown (born 1970), English cricketer
- Alyssa Brown (born 1989), Canadian artistic gymnast
- Antario Brown (born 2002), American football player
- Antonio Brown (born 1978), American football player
- Antonio Brown (born 1988), American football player
- Arkeith Brown (born 1986), American football player
- Austin Brown (American football) (born 2003), American football player
- Barion Brown (born 2003), American football player
- Barrie Brown (1931–2014), Australian rules footballer
- Beniquez Brown (born 1993), American football player
- Blace Brown (born 1996), American football player
- Brant Brown (born 1971), American baseball player and coach
- Brittain Brown (born 1997), American football player
- Bryce Brown (basketball) (born 1997), American basketball player in the Israeli Basketball Premier League
- Camden Brown (born 2004), American football player
- Carlon Brown (born 1989), American basketball player
- CharMar Brown (born 2005), American football player
- Chase Brown (born 2000), Canadian American football player
- Cherrelle Brown (born 1986), English boxer
- Cyril Brown (1918–1990), English footballer
- Dante Brown (born 1980), American football player
- Darby Brown (1929–1988), Australian boxer
- Deonte Brown (born 1998), American football player
- Diane Brown (born 1946), American curler and coach
- Dominique Brown (born 1991), American football player
- Donatello Brown (born 1991), American football player
- Dyami Brown (born 1999), American football player
- Earlene Brown (1935–1983) American athlete
- Ed Brown (racing driver, born 1920) (1920–2000) American racing driver
- Ed Brown (racing driver) (born 1963) American racing driver
- Eliseo Brown (1888 – after 1911), Argentine association football player
- Emmett Brown (born 2003), American football player
- Ernesto Brown (1885–1935), Argentine association football player
- Fa'amanu Brown (born 1994), New Zealand rugby league player
- Fadol Brown (born 1993), American football player
- Felicia Brown (born 1993), American sprinter
- Frankie Brown (born 1987), Scottish association footballer
- Gabe Brown (born 2000), American basketball player
- Gates Brown (1939–2013), American baseball player
- Germaine Brown (born 1994), English professional boxer
- Grady Brown (born 1977), American football coach
- Hank Brown (born 2005), American college football player
- Hunter Brown (born 1998), American baseball player
- Indra Brown (born 2010), Australian freestyle skier
- Ira Brown (born 1982), Japanese basketball player
- J'Covan Brown (born 1990), American basketball player
- Jacurri Brown (born 2003), American college football player
- Jaelyn Brown (born 1998), American basketball player
- Jammal Brown (born 1981), American football player
- Jared Brown (born 1973), American football player
- Jayce Brown (born 2005), American football player
- Jaylen Brown (born 1996), American basketball player
- Jayon Brown (born 1995), American football player
- Ji'Ayir Brown (born 2000), American football player
- Jophery Brown (1945–2014), American baseball player
- Jorge Brown (1880–1936), Argentine association football player
- José Luis Brown (1956–2019), Argentine association football player
- Journey Brown (born 1999), American football player
- Juan Domingo Brown (1888–1931), Argentine association football player
- Jyaire Brown (born 2004), American football player
- Kalani Brown (born 1997), American basketball player
- Kaleb Brown (born 2003), American college football player
- Keyjuan Brown (born 2004), American football player
- Kiel Brown (born 1984), Australian field hockey midfielder
- Kris Brown (born 1976), American football placekicker
- Kristen Brown (born 1992), American pole vaulter
- Kwame Brown (born 1982), American basketball player
- Kyron Brown (born 1996), American football player
- Kyson Brown (born 2005), American football player
- Leddie Brown (born 2000), American football player
- Leigha Brown (born 2000), American basketball player
- Lexie Brown (born 1994), American basketball player
- Lola Brown (born 2007), English footballer
- Lorenzo Brown (born 1990), basketball player
- Mace Brown (1909–2002), American baseball player
- Markel Brown (born 1992), American basketball player
- Marquise Brown (born 1997), American football player
- Montaric Brown (born 1999), American football player
- Monty Brown (born 1970), American professional wrestler
- Mordecai Brown (1876–1948), American baseball player
- Neal Brown (born 1980), American football coach
- Norris Brown (born 1961), American football player
- Que'Sean Brown (born 2005), American football player
- Raleek Brown (born 2003), American football player
- R. M. Brown (1885–1927), American college sports coach
- Ronnie Brown (born 1981), American football player
- Ruben Brown (born 1972), American football player
- Rufus Brown (born 1980), American football player
- Sailor Brown (1915–2008), English footballer
- Shannon Brown (born 1985), American basketball player
- Shakur Brown (born 1999), American football player
- Sherwood Brown (born 1991), American basketball player
- Sky Brown (born 2008), Anglo-Japanese skateboarder
- Stevens Brown (1875–1957), English cricketer
- Tanner Brown (born 1999), American football player
- Tevin Brown (born 1998), American basketball player
- Zabien Brown, American football player

== Other fields ==
- Cheryl Brown (educator), New Zealand education academic
- Letty Brown, New Zealand Māori community leader
- Claudine K. Brown (1949–2016), American museum director
- Derren Brown (born 1971), English magician and psychological illusionist
- Heidi V. Brown, United States Army Major General
- Jill E. Brown (born 1950), African American aviator
- Judy Brown (accountant) (born 1956), New Zealand academic
- Louis M. Brown (1909–1996), American lawyer and pioneer of preventive law
- Madeleine Duncan Brown (1925–2002), alleged mistress of president Lyndon B. Johnson
- Marian and Vivian Brown (1927–2013/14), San Francisco celebrity twins
- Violet Brown (1900–2017), oldest verified person in Jamaica

== Fictional characters ==
- Amber Brown, protagonist of a book series by Paula Danziger
- April, Brad, Helen, and Jay Brown, characters in the 1986 American science fiction comedy horror movie Critters
- Benjamin, Grandma, Kelly, Professor Alex, and Sandy Brown, characters from the Japanese anime The Noozles
- Bob, Kim, and Serena, characters on the CBS television series The Unit
- Buster Brown, comic strip character
- Charlie Brown, principal character of the comic strip Peanuts
- Chesney Brown, in the British ITV soap opera Coronation Street
- Cleveland Brown, main character in the animated TV series The Cleveland Show
- Emmett Brown, in the Back To The Future movie series
- Father Brown, fictional character created by English novelist G. K. Chesterton
- Foxy and Lincoln "Link" Brown, in the 1974 American blaxploitation action movie Foxy Brown
- Grandpa Brown, a character in the 1964 horror–science-fiction movie The Creeping Terror
- Leroy "Encyclopedia" Brown, title character from Donald J. Sobol's Encyclopedia Brown series of children's books
- Lily Brown, a character in the 2005 comedy drama fantasy film Nanny McPhee, played by Jennifer Rae Daykin
- Marie Brown, a character in the 2020 movie Christmas in the Rockies
- Mr. Brown, in the 1971 Spanish/American adventure/western movie Four Rode Out
- Pinkie Brown, a character in the 2010 British movie Brighton Rock
- Reverend Brown, in the 1988 American romantic comedy film Coming to America
- Sam Brown, in the 2004 American animated Western musical comedy movie Home on the Range
- Sammy Brown, a character in the American biographical romantic musical drama teen movie Clouds
- Sandy Brown, in the 1974 American made-for-television comedy movie The Girl Who Came Gift-Wrapped
- Sheriff Brown, a character in the American drama television series Shooter
- William Brown, the main character in the Just William series of children's short stories, written by Richmal Crompton

== Disambiguation pages ==
- Aaron Brown
- Abe Brown
- Adam Brown
- Adrian Brown
- Al Brown
- Alan Brown
- Albert Brown
- Alex Brown
- Alexander Brown
- Alfred Brown
- Alice Brown
- Alistair Brown
- Allan Brown
- Allen Brown
- Amanda Brown
- Andre Brown
- Andrew Brown
- Andy Brown
- Anna Brown
- Anne Brown
- Annie Brown
- Anthony Brown
- Archibald Brown
- Arnold Brown
- Arthur Brown
- Ashley Brown
- Audrey Brown
- Barbara Brown
- Barry Brown
- Ben Brown
- Benjamin Brown
- Bert Brown
- Bertram Brown
- Bill Brown
- Billy Brown
- Blair Brown
- Bob Brown
- Bobby Brown
- Bonnie Brown
- Brenda Brown
- Brian Brown
- Bruce Brown
- Bud Brown
- Buster Brown
- Byron Brown
- Cameron Brown
- Carl Brown
- Carlos Brown
- Carol Brown
- Carolyn Brown
- Catherine Brown
- Cecil Brown
- Chad Brown
- Charles Brown
- Charlotte Brown
- Chris Brown
- Chuck Brown
- Cindy Brown
- Clarence Brown
- Cliff Brown
- Clive Brown
- Colin Brown
- Connor Brown
- Courtney Brown
- Craig Brown
- Curtis Brown
- Dana Brown
- Daniel Brown
- Darrell Brown
- David Brown
- Dean Brown
- Dee Brown
- Dennis Brown
- Derek Brown
- Derrick Brown
- Dick Brown
- Donald Brown
- Donna Brown
- Dorothy Brown
- Doug Brown
- Dustin Brown
- Earl Brown
- Eddie Brown
- Edgar Brown
- Edith Brown
- Edmund Brown
- Edward Brown
- Edwin Brown
- Elizabeth Brown
- Elliot Brown
- Emma Brown
- Emily Brown
- Eric Brown
- Erika Brown
- Ernest Brown
- Errol Brown
- Eugene Brown
- Evan Brown
- Foxy Brown
- Frances Brown
- Francis Brown
- Frank Brown
- Fred Brown
- Gail Brown
- Garry Brown
- Gary Brown
- Gavin Brown
- Gene Brown
- Geoffrey Brown
- George Brown
- George Washington Brown
- Georgia Brown
- Gerald Brown
- Gerry Brown
- Gertrude Brown
- Gilbert Brown
- Gillian Brown
- Glenn Brown
- Godfrey Brown
- Gordon Brown
- Grace Brown
- Greg Brown
- Gus Brown
- Harold Brown
- Harriet Brown
- Harrison Brown
- Harry Brown
- Harvey Brown
- Helen Brown
- Henry Brown
- Herbert Brown
- Horace Brown
- Howard Brown
- Hubert Brown
- Hugh Brown
- Ian Brown
- Isaac Brown
- Ivor Brown
- J. T. Brown
- Jack Brown
- Jackie Brown
- Jacob Brown
- Jake Brown
- James Brown
- Jamie Brown
- Janet Brown
- Jason Brown
- Jeff Brown
- Jeffrey Brown
- Jeremiah Brown
- Jeremy Brown
- Jermaine Brown
- Jerry Brown
- Jesse Brown
- Jim Brown
- Joan Brown
- Joe Brown
- John Brown
- John Henry Brown
- John Robert Brown
- John Young Brown
- John Brown Jr.
- Jonathan Brown
- Jordan Brown
- Joseph Brown
- Josh Brown
- Joyce Brown
- Judith Brown
- Julie Brown
- Justin Brown
- Karen Brown
- Karl Brown
- Kate Brown
- Keith Brown
- Kelly Brown
- Ken Brown
- Kendall Brown
- Kenneth Brown
- Kent Brown
- Kerry Brown
- Kevin Brown
- Kim Brown
- Kyle Brown
- Larry Brown
- Laurie Brown
- Lawrence Brown
- Lee Brown
- Leon Brown
- Leroy Brown
- Les Brown
- Leslie Brown
- Levi Brown
- Lewis Brown
- Lisa Brown
- Lloyd Brown
- Logan Brown
- Louise Brown
- Lucy Brown
- Lyn Brown
- Malcolm Brown
- Marc Brown
- Marcus Brown
- Margaret Brown
- Marilyn Brown
- Mark Brown
- Martha Brown
- Martin Brown
- Marty Brown
- Mary Brown
- Matt Brown
- Maurice Brown
- Max Brown
- Maxine Brown
- Maxwell Brown
- Mel Brown
- Melissa Brown
- Melville Brown
- Melvin Brown
- Michael Brown
- Mick Brown
- Miles Brown
- Millie Brown
- Mitch Brown
- Moses Brown
- Nancy Brown
- Natalie Brown
- Nathan Brown
- Neil Brown
- Nicholas Brown
- Nicole Brown
- Noah Brown
- Norman Brown
- Oliver Brown
- Olivia Brown
- Omar Brown
- Orlando Brown
- Owen Brown
- Pamela Brown
- Pat Brown
- Patrick Brown
- Paul Brown
- Paula Brown
- Percy Brown
- Peter Brown
- Phil Brown
- Philip Brown
- Preston Brown
- Rachel Brown
- Ralph Brown
- Randy Brown
- Raymond Brown
- Rebecca Brown
- Reggie Brown
- Representative Brown
- Ricardo Brown
- Richard Brown
- Rick Brown
- Rob Brown
- Robert Brown
- Robin Brown
- Rod Brown
- Rodney Brown
- Roger Brown
- Roland Brown
- Ronald Brown
- Ronnie Brown
- Rosemary Brown
- Roy Brown
- Russell Brown
- Ruth Brown
- Ryan Brown
- Sam Brown
- Samuel Brown
- Sandra Brown
- Sandy Brown
- Sarah Brown
- Scott Brown
- Sean Brown
- Shannon Brown
- Sharon Brown
- Shawn Brown
- Sheldon Brown
- Sidney Brown
- Simon Brown
- Spencer Brown
- Stan Brown
- Stephanie Brown
- Stephen Brown
- Steve Brown
- Stuart Brown
- Susan Brown
- Taylor Brown
- Ted Brown
- Terry Brown
- Theodore Brown
- Thomas Brown
- Thomas J. Brown
- Timothy Brown
- Tina Brown
- Tom Brown
- Tommy Brown
- Tony Brown
- Travis Brown
- Troy Brown
- Tyler Brown
- Vanessa Brown
- Vernell Brown
- Vernon Brown
- Victor Brown
- Victoria Brown
- Vincent Brown
- Walter Brown
- Warren Brown
- Wayne Brown
- Wendy Brown
- Wesley Brown
- Wilfred Brown
- Will Brown
- William Brown
- William Henry Brown
- Willie Brown
- Wilson Brown
- Woody Brown
- Yvette Brown

== See also ==
- Category:Brown family of Rhode Island
