= Lewis Brown =

Lewis Brown may refer to:

- Lewis H. Brown (1894–1951), American industrialist and founder of the American Enterprise Association
- Lewis H. Brown (American football) (1909–after 1960), American football player
- Lewis Brown (politician) (21st century), Liberian politician
- Lewis Brown (basketball) (1955–2011), American basketball player
- Lewis Brown (rugby league) (born 1986), New Zealand rugby player
- Lewis Brown (cricketer) (1874–1951), English cricketer
- R. Lewis Brown (1892–1948), United States district judge
- Lew Brown (1893–1958), American songwriter
- Lew Brown (baseball) (1858–1889), American baseball player

== See also ==
- Lou Brown (born 1978), English singer-songwriter
- Lou Brown (rugby league) (1905–1947), New Zealand rugby league footballer of the 1920s and 1930s
- Louis Brown Athletic Center (opened 1977)
