= Barry Brown =

Barry Brown is the name of:

- Barry Brown (actor) (1951–1978), American author, playwright and actor
- Barry Brown (American football) (1943–2020), American professional football linebacker and tight end
- Barry Brown (attorney), American professor at Suffolk University Law School
- Barry Brown (boxer) (1931–2004), New Zealand boxer of the 1950s
- Barry Brown (Canadian musician) (born 1952), Canadian country music singer-songwriter
- Barry Brown (director) (born 1934), American film director
- Barry Brown (singer) (1962–2004), Jamaican reggae singer
- Barry Brown (volleyball) (1934–2022), American former volleyball player
- Barry Brown Jr. (born 1996) American basketball player
- Barry Alexander Brown (born 1950), American film editor and director

== See also ==
- Barrie Brown (1931–2014), former Australian rules football player
- Barry v. Brown
- Brown (surname), an English-language surname in origin chiefly descriptive of a person with brown hair, complexion or clothing
