= Malcolm Brown =

Malcolm, Malcom, or Mal Brown may refer to:

== Sports ==
- Malcolm Elmore Brown or Scrappy Brown (1899–1951), American Negro leagues baseball player
- Malcolm Brown (speedway rider) (born 1935), English speedway rider
- Mal Brown (born 1946), Australian rules footballer
- Malcolm Brown (English footballer) (born 1956), English footballer
- Malcolm Brown (American football) (born 1993), American football running back
- Malcolm Brown (cricketer) (born 1961), South African cricketer
- Malcom Brown (born 1994), American football defensive tackle

== Others ==
- Malcolm Brown (politician) (1881–1939), member of the New South Wales Legislative Assembly
- Malcolm Brown (art director) (1903–1967), American art director
- G. Malcolm Brown (1916–1977), Canadian physician
- George Malcolm Brown (1925–1997), British geologist
- Malcolm Brown (journalist) (born 1947), Australian journalist, editor and author
- R. Malcolm Brown Jr. (born 1939), American biologist

== See also ==
- Malcolm Browne (1931–2012), American journalist and photographer
