= Bud Brown =

Bud Brown may refer to:

- Bud Brown (baseball) (fl. 1918–1922), American baseball player
- Bud Brown (politician) (1927–2022), Republican U.S. representative from Ohio
- Bud Brown (American football) (born 1961), former American football player
- Ezra Brown also known as Ezra Abraham "Bud" Brown (born 1944), American mathematician

== See also ==
- Bud Browne (1912–2008), American film maker
