= Dee Brown =

Dee Brown may refer to:

- Dee Brown (American football) (born 1978), American professional football player
- Dee Brown (baseball) (born 1978), American professional baseball player
- Dee Brown (basketball, born 1968), American basketball player, coach, and commentator
- Dee Brown (basketball, born 1984), American basketball player
- Dee Brown (writer) (1908–2002), American novelist and historian
- Dee Brown (politician) (born 1948), American politician

== See also ==
- List of people with surname Brown
- Dee (disambiguation)
