= William Henry Brown =

William Henry Brown may refer to:

- William Henry Brown (playwright) (1790–1884), American playwright and founder of the African theatre
- William Henry Brown (journalist) (1867 or 1868–1950), British co-operative movement journalist and activist
- William Henry Brown (botanist) (1884–1939), author and director of the Bureau of Science in Manila, Philippines
- William Henry Brown (aviator) (1894–1969), Canadian World War I flying ace
- Bill Brown (New Zealand politician) (1899–1967), New Zealand politician of the National Party

== See also ==
- William Brown (disambiguation)
- List of people with surname Brown
