= Lee Brown =

Lee Brown may refer to:

- Lee Brown (footballer) (born 1990), English footballer, for Portsmouth FC
- Lee P. Brown (born 1937), police department chief and mayor of Houston
- Lee Bradley Brown (1971–2011), British tourist allegedly beaten to death by Dubai police
- Lee Ann Brown (born 1963), American poet

== See also ==
- Leigh Brown (born 1982), Australian rules footballer
- Brown (surname)
