= Terry Brown =

Terry Brown may refer to:

== Sports ==
- Terry Brown (football chairman) (born 1942), former chairman of West Ham United football club
- Terry Brown (football manager) (born 1952), former manager of AFC Wimbledon
- Terry Brown (American football) (born 1947), former NFL player for the Minnesota Vikings
- Terence Brown (American football) (born 1986), NFL player for the Miami Dolphins
- Terry Brown (soccer) (born 1964), retired American soccer player
- Terry Brown (skateboarder) (born 1960), American professional skateboarder

== Others ==
- Terry Brown (bishop) (1944–2024), Anglican Bishop of Malaita
- Terry Brown (record producer), English-Canadian record producer
- Terry Brown (museum conservator) (born 1953), American museum conservator-restorer
- Terry Brown (Michigan politician) (born 1959), member of the Michigan House of Representatives
- Terry Brown (Louisiana politician) (born 1946), member of the Louisiana House of Representatives
- Terry M. Brown, Jr. (born 1987), member of the North Carolina House of Representatives
- Terry W. Brown (1950–2014), member of the Mississippi Senate
- Terry Brown (brothel owner) (died 2025), New Zealand underworld kingpin

== See also ==
- Terence Browne, 9th Marquess of Sligo (1873–1952), Irish peer
