= Andre Brown =

Andre or André Brown may refer to:

- Andre Brown (basketball) (born 1981), American basketball player
- Andre Brown (volleyball) (born 1990), Canadian volleyball player
- Andre Brown (running back) (born 1986), American football running back
- Andre Brown (wide receiver) (born 1966), American football wide receiver
- Andre Rosey Brown (1956–2006), American film and television actor, police officer and football coach
- Doctor Dré (André Brown, born 1963), American radio personality and former MTV VJ
