= Victor Brown =

Victor Brown may refer to:

- Victor Brown (EastEnders), fictional character from EastEnders
- Vic Brown (footballer) (1903–1971), English footballer
- Victor L. Brown (1914–1996), Canadian leader in The Church of Jesus Christ of Latter-day Saints
- Victor Upton-Brown (1880–1964), Australian rules football coach
- Victor Brown (musician) (c. 1921–2016), Cuban-born, Jamaican-British variety performer
- Victor Brown (footballer) (born 1984), Nigerian footballer
