= Mayor Brown =

Mayor Brown may refer to numerous mayors:

- Adam M. Brown, mayor of Pittsburgh in 1901
- Aja Brown, mayor of Compton, CA
- Arthur Winton Brown, mayor of Wellington, New Zealand in 1886 and 1890
- Byron Brown, mayor of Buffalo, NY
- Charles Brown (mayor), mayor of Murray, Utah from 1906 to 1909
- Daniel Brown (politician), acting mayor of Knoxville, Tennessee
- Darius A. Brown, mayor of Kansas City, Missouri from 1910 to 1911
- David Brown, mayor of Charlottesville, Virginia in 2004–2008
- Fergy Brown, mayor of York, Ontario from 1988 to 1994
- Fielding A. Brown, mayor of Key West, Florida, from 1833 to 1834
- George William Brown (mayor), mayor of Baltimore, Maryland from 1860 to 1861
- Jerry Brown, former mayor of Oakland, CA and former California governor
- Joseph Brown (Missouri politician), twenty-first mayor of St. Louis, Missouri
- Joseph Owen Brown, mayor of Pittsburgh, Pennsylvania from 1901 to 1903
- Lee P. Brown, mayor of Houston, Texas from 1998 to 2004
- Len Brown, mayor of Auckland in New Zealand from 2010 to 2016
- Michael Brown (mayor), mayor of Grand Forks, North Dakota
- Samuel Brown (mayor), mayor of Wellington, New Zealand from 1887 to 1888
- Whitford Brown, 1st mayor of Porirua
- William E. Brown Jr., former mayor of Ann Arbor, Michigan
- Willie Brown (politician), former mayor of San Francisco, CA
- Yvonne Brown, current (as of 2007) mayor of Tchula, Mississippi

== In fiction ==
- Mayor Brown, the main antagonist of the 2010 film, Yogi Bear

== See also ==
- Mayer Brown, law firm
- Brown (surname)
