= Justin Brown =

Justin Brown may refer to:

- Justin Brown (aquanaut), American professional aquanaut
- Justin Brown (defensive lineman) (born 1982), American gridiron football defensive end
- Justin Brown (diplomat), Australian diplomat
- Justin Brown (politician), Missouri state senator
- Justin Brown (rower) (1904–1933), British rower
- Justin Brown (wide receiver) (born 1991), American gridiron football wide receiver
- Justin Brown (author) (born 1973), New Zealand author
- Justin Brown (racing driver) (born 2002), American stock car racing driver

== See also ==
- C. Justin Brown, American defense attorney
