= Nicole Brown (disambiguation) =

Nicole Brown may refer to:

- Nicole Brown (film executive)
- Nicole Brown (social scientist)
- Nicole Brown Simpson (1959–1994), American murder victim
