= Jacob Brown =

Jacob Brown may refer to:

- Jacob Brown (general) (1775–1828), American officer during the War of 1812
- Jacob Brown (Texas soldier) (1789–1846), American soldier
- J. Hay Brown (1849–1930), American judge from Pennsylvania
- Jacob Brown (footballer) (born 1998), Scottish footballer

== See also ==
- List of people with surname Brown
