= Aaron Brown =

Aaron Brown may refer to:

== Sportspeople ==
- Aaron Brown (defensive lineman) (1943–1997), American football player
- Aaron Brown (running back) (born 1985), American football player
- Aaron Brown (linebacker, born 1956), American NFL and CFL linebacker
- Aaron Brown (linebacker, born 1988), American football player
- Aaron Brown (footballer, born 1980), English footballer who played for Bristol City
- Aaron Brown (footballer, born 1983), English footballer who played for Preston North End
- Aaron Brown (sprinter) (born 1992), Canadian sprinter
- Aaron Brown (rugby league) (born 1992), British rugby league footballer
- Aaron Brown (footballer, born 2002), Northern Irish footballer, see List of Bury F.C. players (1–24 appearances)
- Aaron Brown (1883–1934), Hall of Fame Boxer, better known as Dixie Kid

== Other people ==
- Aaron Brown (journalist) (1948–2024), American broadcast journalist
- Aaron Brown (financial author) (born 1956), American financial author and professor
- Aaron Brown (musician) (born 1980), Australian-American violinist and composer
- Aaron V. Brown (1795–1859), American politician
  - USS Aaron V. Brown
- Aaron Brown (1987–2006), fatally shot by police officer, Alexandria, VA
