= Glenn Brown =

Glen(n) Brown may refer to:

- Glenn Brown (architect) (1854–1932), American architect and historian
- Glenn Brown (artist) (born 1966), British artist
- Glen Brown (c. 1943–2019), Jamaican reggae musician
- Glen Brown (footballer) (born 1962), Australian rules footballer
- Glen E. Brown (born 1943), American politician in Utah
