= Theodore Brown =

Theodore Brown may refer to:

- Theodore L. Brown (1928–2026), American chemist, university administrator, and philosopher of science
- Theodore M. Brown (born 1942), American professor of public health and policy, medical humanities and history
- Steve Brown (bass player) (Theodore Brown, 1890–1965), American jazz musician
- Ted Brown (radio) (Theodore David Brown, 1924–2005), American radio personality
- Ted Brown (saxophonist) (Theodore G. Brown, born 1927), American jazz musician

== See also ==
- Ted Brown (disambiguation)
