= Errol Brown (disambiguation) =

Errol Brown (1943–2015) was a British-Jamaican singer and songwriter.

Errol Brown may also refer to:

- Errol Brown (engineer), Jamaican audio engineer
- Errol Brown (cricketer) (born 1952), Jamaican cricketer

== See also ==
- Erroll M. Brown (born 1950), United States Coast Guard admiral
