= Kevin Brown =

Kevin Brown may refer to:

== Entertainment ==
- Kevin Brown (blues musician) (born 1950), English blues guitarist
- Kevin Brown (author) (born 1960), American journalist and translator
- Kevin Brown (poet) (born 1970), American poet and teacher
- Kevin Brown (actor) (born 1972), American actor and comedian
- Agent K, a fictional character played by Tommy Lee Jones in the Men in Black films

== Sports ==
=== Baseball ===
- Kevin Brown (right-handed pitcher) (born 1965), American baseball player
- Kevin Brown (left-handed pitcher) (born 1966), American baseball player
- Kevin Brown (catcher) (born 1973), American baseball player
- Kevin Brown (sportscaster), American sportscaster

=== Other sports ===
- Kevin Brown (Australian footballer) (1920–2009), Australian rules footballer
- Kevin Brown (rugby league, born 1933) (1933–2000), Australian rugby league player
- Kevin Brown (rugby league, born 1984), English rugby league footballer
- Kevin Brown (cricketer) (born 1941), Australian cricketer
- Kevin Brown (punter) (born 1963), American football punter
- Kevin Brown (defensive tackle) (born 1985), American football player
- Kevin Brown (linebacker) (born 1993), American football player
- Kevin Brown (running back) (born 1996), American football player
- Kevin Brown (ice hockey) (born 1974), Canadian ice hockey player
- Kevin Brown (bandy) (born 1993), American bandy player in Sweden
- Kevin Brown (discus thrower) (born 1964), British-Jamaican athlete
- Kevin Brown (pole vaulter) (born 1971), American pole vaulter, 1994 All-American for the North Carolina Tar Heels track and field team

== Other ==
- Kevin Brown (historian) (born 1961), English historian of medicine, archivist, and curator
- Kevin S. Brown, bishop of the Episcopal Church in Delaware
- Kevin Brown (politician) (born 1982), member of the Connecticut House of Representatives

== See also ==
- List of people with surname Brown
- Kev Brown, American music producer and artist
