= Gilbert Brown (disambiguation) =

Gilbert Brown (born 1971) is an American football player.

Gilbert Brown may also refer to:

- Gilbert Brown (basketball) (born 1987), American basketball coach and former player
- Gilbert Brown (rugby league)
