= Ricardo Brown =

Ricardo Brown may refer to:

- Ricardo Brown (basketball) (born 1957), former Philippine Basketball Association player
- Ricardo Brown (boxer) (born 1990), Jamaican boxer
- Ricardo Brown (journalist), Cuban-born television journalist
- Ricardo Emmanuel Brown (born 1972), birth name of American rapper Kurupt
