= Ivor Brown (disambiguation) =

Ivor Brown (1891–1974) was a British journalist.

Ivor Brown may also refer to:

- Ivor Brown (footballer) (1888–1966), English footballer for Tottenham Hotspur, Coventry City, Reading and Swansea Town
- Ivor Brown (speedway rider) (1927–2005), English motorcycle speedway rider
