= Amanda Brown =

Amanda Brown may refer to:

- Amanda Brown (novelist) (born 1977), American author of the novel Legally Blonde (basis for the film)
- Amanda Brown (musician) (born 1965), Australian musician and former member of The Go-Betweens
- Amanda Brown (tennis) (born 1965), British former tennis player
- Amanda Brown (voice actress) (born 1980), American voice actress of many 4Kids voice roles, including Zoey Hanson in Mew Mew Power
- Amanda Brown (singer) (born 1985), American contestant on the third season of The Voice
- Amanda M. Brown, American immunologist and microbiologist
