= Joyce Brown =

Joy or Joyce Brown may refer to:

- Joyce F. Brown (born 1947), African American academic, President of Fashion Institute of Technology
- Joyce Patricia Brown (1947–2005), whose case against New York City made legal precedent against involuntary psychiatric commitment of the homeless
- Joyce Brown (beauty queen), winner in 1954 of the National Sweetheart beauty pageant
- Joyce Brown (netball) (born 1938), Australian netball player
- Joyce Ann Brown (1947–2015), American wrongfully convicted of robbery and murder in 1980

== See also ==
- Joy Browne (1944–2016), American radio psychologist
- Joy Brown Clement (born 1948), American judge
