= Omar Brown =

Omar Brown may refer to:

- Omar Brown (sprinter, born 1982), Jamaican sprinter who ran for the Arkansas Razorbacks
- Omar Brown (sprinter, born 1975), Jamaican hurdler and sprinter who ran for the Oklahoma Sooners
- Omar Brown (defensive back, born 1975), American football player
- Omar Brown (defensive back, born 1988), American football player
- Omar Brown (safety) (born 2000), American football player

== See also ==
- Omar Browne (born 1994), Panamanian footballer
- List of people with surname Brown
