= Barbara Brown =

Barbara Brown may refer to:

- Barbara Brown (actress) (1901–1975), American actress
- Barbara Brown (athlete) (1941–1969), American Olympic athlete
- Barbara Brown (scientist) (1921–1999), American researcher and popularizer of biofeedback and neurofeedback
- Barbara Brown (figure skater) (born 1953), American figure skater
- Barbara Elaine Russell Brown (1929–2019), American biologist and philanthropist
- Barbara Illingworth Brown (1924–2016), biochemist and researcher of metabolic disorders
- Barbara Brown (died 2010), lead singer of vocal group Barbara and the Browns
- Barbara Brown, occasional alias of Barbara Bonfiglio (born 1975), also known as Misstress Barbara, Canadian house music producer
- Barbara Brown, co-founder of Northwestern Polytechnic University
- Barbara Brown, character in American Psycho 2

== See also ==
- Barbara Brown's titi (Callicebus barbarabrownae), a Brazilian species of monkey
- Bairbre de Brún (born 1954), Irish politician
