= Vic Brown (footballer) =

English footballer

Personal information
- Full name: Victor Charles Brown
- Date of birth: 26 July 1903
- Place of birth: Bedford, England
- Date of death: 1971 (aged 67–68)
- Height: 5 ft 11 in (1.80 m)
- Position: Right back

Senior career*
Years	Team	Apps	(Gls)
–1929	Bedford Town		
1929–1933	Leeds United	1	(0)
1933–1939	Coventry City	100	(0)
1939–1942	Chester		
	→ Wrexham (guest)	1	
	→ New Brighton (guest)	1	
- HFC Haarlem
- * Club domestic league appearances and goals

Victor Charles Brown (26 July 1903 – 1971) was an English professional footballer who played as a right back in the Football League for Coventry City and Leeds United. After his retirement as a player, he coached at Coventry City.

== Career statistics ==
Appearances and goals by club, season and competition
Club	Season	League			National Cup		Total	
Club	Season	Division	Apps	Goals	Apps	Goals	Apps	Goals
Leeds United	1930–31	First Division	1	0	0	0	1	0
Coventry City	1933–34	Third Division South	28	0	2	0	30	0
Coventry City	1934–35	Third Division South	37	0	3	0	40	0
Coventry City	1935–36	Third Division South	23	0	2	0	25	0
Coventry City	1936–37	Second Division	2	0	0	0	2	0
Coventry City	Total		100	0	7	0	107	0
Career total			101	0	7	0	108	0
