= Owen Brown =

Owen Brown may refer to:

- Owen Brown (abolitionist, born 1771) (1771–1856), father of John Brown, the abolitionist
- Owen Brown (abolitionist, born 1824) (1824–1889), son of John Brown, the abolitionist
- Owen Brown (footballer) (born 1960), football forward
- Owen Brown, Columbia, Maryland
