= Courtney Brown =

Courtney Brown is the name of:

- Courtney Brown (soccer) (born 2000), American soccer midfielder
- Courtney Brown (sprinter) (born 1965), Canadian Olympic sprinter
- Courtney Brown (defensive back) (born 1984), American football player
- Courtney Brown (defensive end) (born 1978), American football player
- Courtney Brown (social scientist) (born 1952), American political scientist and parapsychologist
- Courtney Brown, Lloyd Bridges' scuba instructor and stunt double for Sea Hunt

== See also ==
- Courtney Browne (born 1970), Barbadian cricketer
