= Clive Brown (disambiguation) =

Clive Brown (born 1946) is an Australian state politician.

Clive Brown may also refer to:

- Clive Brown (golfer) in 1997 Walker Cup
- Clive Brown (footballer) (1934–2009), Australian footballer for Geelong
- Clive Brown (motorcyclist), British motorcycle racer, in 1971 Grand Prix motorcycle racing season
- Clive Brown (musician), bassist in Ras Nas
