= List of killings by law enforcement officers in the United States in the 1900s =

This is a list of people reported killed by non-military law enforcement officers in the United States in the 1900s, whether in the line of duty or not, and regardless of reason or method. The listing documents the occurrence of a death, making no implications regarding wrongdoing or justification on the part of the person killed or officer involved. Killings are arranged by date of the incident that caused death. Different death dates, if known, are noted in the description. This page lists 78 people.

== 1900-1909 ==
The table below lists 78 people.

Date	Name (age) of deceased	Race	State (city)	Description
1909-12-26	Leonardo/Alonzo Cota (24)	Hispanic/Latino	California (Santa Barbara)	Cota allegedly assaulted an officer at a Christmas Eve dance. The officer fired a warning shot, then shot Cota in the abdomen. He died at hospital.
1909-12-26	Andrew McCormack (44)		California (San Francisco)	McCormack shot at a bartender and wounded a patron while drinking at a saloon. He fled and shot and wounded a pursuing patrolman before the officer returned fire, killing him.
1909-11-22	unnamed man	Black	Louisiana (Leesville)	
1909-10-14	Henry Jones	Black	Georgia (Toccoa)	
1909-09-24	unnamed man		Missouri (Rushville)	
1909-06-05	Adolph Topf		Arkansas (Little Rock)	
1909-05-30	Joseph Menard		Illinois (Chicago)	Menard was shot in an instance of mistaken identity by a policeman who was pursuing two suspects. The suspects had shot and wounded another officer.
1909-04-04	Robert Gresham		Georgia (Fitzgerald)	
1909-03-08	Isabella T. Spillane (46)		Massachusetts (Boston)	Patrolman Daniel D. Spillane shot and killed his wife at their home in East Boston before fatally shooting himself.
1908-12-28	Lawrence Cyrille Verdon (24)		Montana (Anaconda)	
1908-12-26	James Thomas		Virginia (Saltville)	
1908-12-08	John Sharp		Missouri (Kansas City)	
1908-12-08	Lola Pratt (child)		Missouri (Kansas City)	
1908-11-01	J.V. Dalaney		Oregon (Portland)	Dalaney was shot by a policeman as he brandished a revolver while attempting to escape arrest.
1908-08-06	Scott Pounds (21)		California (San Francisco)	Pounds and 18-year-old Ray Baird were pursued by police officers after they robbed a saloon. Pounds was shot once as he fled, while Baird was apprehended.
1908-01-20	Frank Connelly		Missouri (Charleston)	
1907-11-10	Joseph Vaclena		Illinois (Chicago)	
1907-11-10	unnamed man		Illinois (Chicago)	
1907-11-08	unidentified man		Nevada (Reno)	Policeman Charles Brown attempted to apprehend three men complicit in an armed robbery. One of the men was shot dead by Brown when the suspect attempted to shoot the policeman. Brown and a bystander were also injured during the resulting gunfight.
1907-08-19	Noel Bounds	Black	Tennessee (Nashville)	
1906-11-07	Bob Hackworth	Black	Alabama (Linden)	
1906-03-19	Thomas Murphy		Missouri (Springfield)	Murphy and his companion, M.J. Curtis, were pursued by police. Murphy attempted to shoot a policeman and was shot, while Curtis surrendered.
1905-05-13	Andrew Nevills (23)		California (Stockton)	Nevills, a suspect in an armed robbery, was shot in the leg by a detective as he fled arrest. He died of his injury on May 24.
1905-01-31	Edward Bannon		Massachusetts (Boston)	Bannon, a burglar, allegedly assaulted a police officer while fleeing the scene of a burglary, causing serious injuries. He was shot and killed by the officer during a pursuit when he reportedly turned around and brandished a revolver.
1904-11-11	unnamed man		Washington (Chattaroy)	
1904-09-28	Alexander G. Meyers (18)		California (Bakersfield)	Meyers shot at a policeman who encountered him burglarizing a saloon. The policeman shot him to death.
1904-04-24	Albert Thorndyke		California (San Jose)	Thorndyke committed an armed robbery and was chased by officers, who shot him three times.
1903-12-28	Calloway Blue	Black	North Carolina (Hoffman)	
1903-12-28	John Blue	Black	North Carolina (Hoffman)	
1903-12-26	Mr. Klymer		Tennessee (Dyersburg)	A constable killed Klymer, mortally wounded Wright and "slightly injured" a judge.
1903-12-26	Frank Wright		Tennessee (Dyersburg)	A constable killed Klymer, mortally wounded Wright and "slightly injured" a judge.
1903-12-18	William Tolliver	Black	Indiana (Indianapolis)	
1903-12-18	Joseph Choisser (50)		California (Los Angeles)	
1903-12-18	Louis Choisser (25)		California (Los Angeles)	
1903-12-17	unnamed man		Massachusetts (Boston)	
1903-12-14	H. J. Kressenberg		Tennessee (Memphis)	
1903-12-14	Hosea Call		Kansas (Leavenworth)	
1903-12-08	T. H. Thomas	Black	Florida (Jacksonville)	
1903-12-03	Dudley Pittman (24)	White	Alabama (Girard)	
1903-11-28	unnamed man		California (Oakland)	
1903-11-13	William Franklin White	Black	Tennessee (Memphis)	
1903-11-10	William Cuff		Idaho (Wallace)	
1903-10-23	C. R. "Rod" Raney		Missouri (Kansas City)	
1903-10-20	unnamed man	Black	Louisiana (New Orleans)	
1903-10-20	unnamed man	Black	Louisiana (New Orleans)	
1903-10-20	unnamed man	Black	Louisiana (New Orleans)	
1903-10-19	Patrick O'Hara (50)		California (Santa Rosa)	
1903-10-10	unnamed man	Black	Georgia (Griffin)	
1903-10-08	unnamed man	White	Mississippi (Laurel)	
1903-10-08	unnamed man (45)		Illinois (Aurora)	
1903-10-07	Charles A. Dodson		California (San Francisco)	Dodson was shot in the back as he fled from Officer John Smithson, who attempted to arrest him after a street fight. He died of his injuries on October 8. Smithson said that the shooting was accidental and that he fired shots to scare Dodson.
1903-09-28	David Gritt		Tennessee (Knoxville)	
1903-08-10	unnamed person		Oklahoma (Pawhuska)	
1903-08-10	unnamed person		Oklahoma (Pawhuska)	
1903-04-20	Frank Redmond		Georgia (Gainesville)	
1903-04-12	Ed Porter	Black	Louisiana (Shreveport)	
1903-03-12	Burke Carroll		Mississippi (Meridian)	
1902-12-24	C. F. Hood		Mississippi (Laurel)	
1902-09-05	Govan Sneede		Massachusetts (Boston)	While escaping the site of an attempted burglary, Sneede allegedly fired a shot at a police officer, who returned fire and fatally shot the suspect.
1902-07-01	Antonio Guissepe		Pennsylvania (Wilkesbarre)	
1902-05-23	Walter White		New York (Harlem)	
1901-10-06	unnamed man	Black	Montgomery (West Virginia)	
1901-10-06	unnamed man	Black	Montgomery (West Virginia)	
1901-10-06	unnamed man	Black	Montgomery (West Virginia)	
1901-06-04	unnamed man		Colorado (Denver)	
1901-05-03	Hugh Masterson		Colorado (Denver)	
1900-12-21	Edward Donovan		Illinois (Chicago)	
1900-12-01	Thos. White		Minnesota (Minneapolis)	
1900-11-26	John Hubbard		Kentucky (Middlesboro)	
1900-10-15	Francisco Bernal		Arizona (Phoenix)	Bernal was shot and killed and his brother wounded by a policeman when they fired guns at him.
1900-09-23	Myron Brown (28)		California (Alameda)	Brown was shot by Policeman George N. MacRae as he fled arrest with two accomplices. Brown died of pneumonia resulting from his wounds on September 27. MacRae was charged with manslaughter.
1900-09-16	Edward Morse (37)		Washington (Seattle)	Morse and two accomplices exchanged gunfire with police after an attempted burglary. Morse was killed, and another robber, Harry Austin, was wounded.
1900-08-26	Joseph Brady (20)		Pennsylvania (Philadelphia)	
1900-07-27	Robert Charles (34–35)	Black	Louisiana (New Orleans)	Charles was shot by a special policeman and riddled with the bullets by a white mob. The mob then mutilated Charles' body.
1900-06-16	Patrick Farley		New York (New York City)	Farley was shot by police as he attempted to escape arrest after he assaulted his wife.
1900-05-31	Albert Koenig		Missouri (St. Louis)	Koenig was shot by an officer after he shot another policeman with a shotgun.
1900-01-27	Charles Dennis		Illinois (Quincy)	Dennis and Monaghan, two bank robbers, brandished firearms during a police raid and were shot. Another suspect was wounded by police gunfire and arrested.
1900-01-27	Thomas Monaghan		Illinois (Quincy)	Dennis and Monaghan, two bank robbers, brandished firearms during a police raid and were shot. Another suspect was wounded by police gunfire and arrested.

== See also ==
- Death in custody § United States
- Henry A. Wallace Police Crime Public Database
- List of cases of police brutality
- List of countries with annual rates and counts for killings by law enforcement officers
- List of law enforcement officers killed in the line of duty in the United States
- List of law enforcement officers convicted for an on-duty killing in the United States
- List of shootings by US immigration agents
- List of police reforms related to the George Floyd protests
- List of unarmed African Americans killed by law enforcement officers in the United States
- Lists of killings by law enforcement officers
- Police brutality in the United States
- Police misconduct § United States
- Police riot § United States
- Police use of deadly force in the United States
