= Ernest Brown =

E(a)rnest (or Ernie) Brown(e) may refer to:

== Politicians ==
- Ernest Brown (British politician) (1881–1962), British politician
- Ernest M. Brown (1890–1961), member of the Legislative Assembly of Alberta
- Ernest S. Brown (1903–1965), U.S. Senator from Nevada
- Earnest Brown Jr. (born 1970), American jurist and politician in Arkansas

== Sportspeople ==
- Ernest Brown (basketball) (born 1979), American basketball player
- Ernest Brown (coach) (1872–1905), American football player and coach with the Georgia Bulldogs
- Ernie Brown (gridiron football) (born 1971), American football defensive end
- Earnest Brown IV (born 1999), American football defensive end
- Ernest Brown (cyclist), Welsh cyclist and rugby player

== Others ==
- Ernest Brown (dancer) (1916–2009), African American tap dancer
- Ernest William Brown (1866–1938), British mathematician and astronomer
- Ernie Lively (Ernest Wilson Brown Jr., 1947–2021), American actor
- Ernest Brown (photographer) (1877–1951), Scottish photographer
