= Vernon Brown =

Vernon Brown may refer to:

- Vernon Brown (musician) (1907–1979), American big band trombonist from Benny Goodman's orchestra
- Vernon Brown (architect) (1905–1965), New Zealand architect and educator
- Vernon Brown (murderer) (1953–2005), American murderer and suspected serial killer
- Vernon Brown (rugby union referee), in 2013 Women's Six Nations Championship
- Vernon J. Brown (1874–1964), 45th Lieutenant Governor of Michigan

== See also ==
- Verne Brown, Back to the Future character
