= Sharon Brown =

Sharon Brown may refer to:

- Sharon Brown (Miss USA) (born 1943), Miss USA 1961
- Sharon Brown (singer), American singer-songwriter and musician
- Sharon Brown (writer) (born 1946), Canadian author
- Sharon Brown (actress) (born 1962), American actress of stage, film and television
- Sharon Brown, dam (mother) of thoroughbred racehorse Holy Bull
- Sharon Brown (politician) (born 1962), member of the Washington Senate
