= Kendall Brown =

Kendall Brown may refer to:

- Kendall Brown (basketball) (born 2003), American basketball player
- Kendall Brown (snowboarder) (born 1989), New Zealand snowboarder
