= LaForest E. Brown =

American politician

LaForest E. Brown (August 10, 1858 – May 8, 1942) was an American farmer and politician.

Brown was born in Green Lake, Wisconsin and moved to Brown County, Minnesota in 1869. He had moved to Minnesota in 1865. He lived with his wife and family in Springfield, Minnesota and was a farmer. Brown served on the University of Minnesota Board of Regents. He also served in the Minnesota Senate from 1915 to 1918.
