= Nicole Brown (film executive) =

American film producer

Nicole Brown is a film executive, producer, and president of TriStar Pictures.

== Early life and education ==
Brown was raised in Los Angeles. She graduated from Columbia University.

== Career ==
Brown is the former executive vice president at Good Universe. She was named president of Sony Pictures Entertainment's TriStar Pictures in October 2020.
