= Leroy Brown =

Leroy Brown may refer to:

- Leroy Brown (coach) (1887–?), American football and basketball coach
- Leroy Brown (high jumper) (1902–1970), Olympic medal-winning American athlete
- Leroy Brown (wrestler) (1950–1988), American professional wrestler
- Leroy Brown, fictional protagonist of the book series Encyclopedia Brown

== See also ==
- "Bad, Bad Leroy Brown", a 1973 song by Jim Croce
- "Bring Back That Leroy Brown", a 1974 song by Queen
- "Mrs. Leroy Brown", a 2004 song by Loretta Lynn
