= Georgia Brown =

Georgia Brown may refer to:

== People ==
- Georgia Brown, married name of Tiny Broadwick (1893–1978), first woman to parachute from an airplane and inventor of the ripcord
- Georgia Brown (English singer) (1933–1992), actress and singer
- Georgia Brown (Brazilian singer) (born 1980), Guinness World Records holder for singing the highest recorded vocal note
- Georgia Louise Harris Brown (1918–1999), American architect
- Georgia-Rose Brown (born 1995), Australian artistic gymnast
- Georgia Brown (footballer) (born 2002), defender for Sporting Club Jacksonville

== Fictional characters ==
- Georgia Brown, a fictional character from Broadway play and film Cabin in the Sky
- Georgia Brown, a recurring character of the Australian television series Neighbours

== See also ==
- "Sweet Georgia Brown", a 1920s jazz song
- "Sweet Georgia Brown", a song from the 2010 album Daughters by Daughters
