= Errol Brown (cricketer) =

Jamaican cricketer (born 1952)

Personal information
- Full name: Errol Earl Brown
- Born: 16 June 1952 (age 74); St Catherine, Jamaica
- Batting: Right-handed
- Bowling: Right-arm off-spin

Domestic team information
- Years: Team
- 1977–78 to 1984–85: Jamaica

Career statistics
Competition	First-class	List A
Matches	19	4
Runs scored	290	19
Batting average	17.05	9.50
100s/50s	0/0	0/0
Top score	41 not out	11
Balls bowled	3978	156
Wickets	34	1
Bowling average	41.23	81.00
5 wickets in innings	1	0
10 wickets in match	0	–
Best bowling	6/62	1/4
Catches/stumpings	3/–	0/–
- Source: Cricinfo, 29 June 2014

Errol Earl Brown (born 16 June 1952) is a former Jamaican cricketer who played first-class cricket from 1978 to 1985. He toured India and Sri Lanka in 1978–79 with the West Indian team but did not play Test cricket.

Brown made his first-class debut for Jamaica in the 1977–78 season, playing five games and taking 15 wickets at an average of 33.00 with his off-spin, with a best analysis of 6 for 62 in the victory over Trinidad.

When most of the senior West Indian cricketers were playing World Series Cricket in Australia in the 1978–79 season, Brown was one of several inexperienced players to be selected for the tour of India. He played in eight of the first-class matches, but took only eight wickets. He played a few matches for Jamaica later that season, and two more in 1984–85, but with little success.
