= Emma Brown (disambiguation) =

Emma Brown is the title of a manuscript by Charlotte Brontë.

Emma Brown may also refer to:

- Emma Brown (political advisor), American political advisor and advocate
- Emma Brown (powerlifter) (born 1979), British Paralympic powerlifter
- Emma Elizabeth Brown (1847–1937), American painter and writer
- Emma V. Brown, American educator
