= Kim Brown =

Kim Brown may refer to:

- Kim Brown (The Unit), a fictional character on the CBS television series The Unit
- Kim Brown (musician) (1945–2011), British-born Finland-based musician with The Renegades
- Kimberly J. Brown (born 1984), American actress
