= Gavin Brown =

Gavin Brown may refer to:

- Gavin Brown (academic) (1942–2010), former Vice-Chancellor of the University of Sydney
- Gavin Brown (art dealer), British art dealer
- Gavin Brown (diver) (1984–2007), English diver
- Gavin Brown (footballer) (born 1967), former Australian rules footballer in the Australian Football League
- Gavin Brown (musician), Canadian musician and record producer
- Gavin Brown (politician) (born 1975), Member of the Scottish Parliament
- Gavin Brown (rugby league) (born 1977), English former rugby league footballer
