= Sheldon Brown =

Sheldon Brown may refer to:

- Sheldon Brown (artist) (born 1962), American artist and professor of computer art
- Sheldon Brown (American football) (born 1979), American football player
- Sheldon Brown (bicycle mechanic) (1944–2008), American bicycle mechanic, writer, and webmaster
