= Timothy Brown =

Timothy, Timmy, or Tim Brown may refer to:

== Music ==
- Timothy Brown (bassist) (born 1969), bassist for the band The Boo Radleys
- Timothy Brown (conductor) (born 1946), English choral conductor
- Timothy Brown (hornist), English hornist

== Sports ==
=== Gridiron football ===
- Tim Brown (American football) (born 1966), American wide receiver and 1987 Heisman Trophy winner
- Tim Brown (Canadian football) (born 1984), American football running back and kick returner in the Canadian Football League
- Timmy Brown or Timothy Brown (actor) (1937–2020), American football running back in the NFL and actor

=== Other sports ===
- Tim Brown (darts player) (born 1944), retired Australian darts player
- Tim Brown (figure skater) (1938–1989), American former figure skater
- Tim Brown (footballer) (born 1981), association football player from New Zealand
- Tim Brown (racing driver), American stock car racing driver

== Others ==
- Timothy Brown (actor) (1937–2020), American singer and former actor and NFL football player
- Timothy Brown (game designer), American role-playing game designer
- Timothy Brown (judge) (1889–1977), American jurist
- Timothy Brown (radical) (1743/4–1820), English banker, merchant and radical
- Timothy Ray Brown (1966–2020), also known as the Berlin Patient, American considered to be the first person cured of HIV
- Timothy Yeats Brown (1789–1858), banker and British consul to Genoa
- Tim Brown (Indiana politician) (born 1956), American politician
- Timothy Brown (North Dakota politician), American politician
- Tim Brown (Ohio politician) (born 1962), American politician

== See also ==
- Spirit House (Georgetown, New York), also known as Timothy Brown House or Brown's Hall
