= Howard Brown =

Howard Brown may refer to:

- Howard Brown (Halifax Bank) (born c. 1966), British employee of Halifax Bank who became famous for appearing in their commercials
- Howard Brown (pianist) (1920–2001), Canadian pianist
- Howard Clifton Brown (1868–1946), British politician
- Howard J. Brown (businessman) (c. 1923–2011), American United Communications Corporation owner
- Howard Junior Brown (1924–1975), American gay rights activist
  - Howard Brown Health Center in Chicago, named for Howard Junior Brown
- Howard Mayer Brown (1930–1993), American musicologist
- Howard Elis Brown (1902–1992), Canadian merchant and politician from Ontario

== See also ==
- Howie Brown (1922–1975), guard in the National Football League
