= Victoria Brown =

Victoria Brown may refer to:

- Victoria Brown (canoeist) (born 1950), British canoer
- Victoria Brown (water polo) (born 1985), Australian water polo player
- Vicki Brown (1940–1991), English singer

== See also ==
- Victoria Browne, British philosopher
