= Rachel Brown (disambiguation) =

Rachel Brown-Finnis (born 1980) is an English former footballer.

Rachel Brown may also refer to:

- Rachel Fuller Brown (1898–1980), American chemist
- Rachel Brown (flautist), British flautist and author
- Rachel Brown (singer), American singer
- Rachel Brown (musician), American musician and member of Water from Your Eyes
- Rachel Brown (scientist) (born 1970), New Zealand nutritional scientist
- Rachel Fulton Brown (born 1965), American professor of medieval history
- Rachelle Brown or Rachel Brown (born 1986), Canadian curler

== See also ==
- Rachel Browne (1934–2012), Canadian dancer and choreographer
