= Janine Brown =

American scientist

Janine L. Brown
- Born: 1954 (age 71–72)
- Education: North Dakota State University; Washington State University
- Known for: Reproductive biology of endangered species
- Scientific career
- Fields: Veterinary physiology Veterinary endocrinology
- Workplaces: National Zoological Park (United States); Smithsonian Conservation Biology Institute

Janine L. Brown (born 1954) is a scientist specializing in the reproductive biology of endangered species. She is the head of the National Zoological Park's Endocrine Research Laboratory at the Smithsonian Conservation Biology Institute. Brown has helped to develop non-invasive techniques for tracking fertility in wild animals. Brown has been called "a world authority on elephant reproductive biology" and is in charge of the elephant reproduction program at the National Zoological Park (United States).

== Life ==
She received her Bachelor of Arts in animal sciences from North Dakota State University in 1976, and her Master of Arts in 1980 and Doctor of Philosophy in 1984 in animal sciences from Washington State University. She was later chosen for the Washington State University Women’s History Alumni Recognition Award in 2002

== Selected publications ==
- Daigle, C. L.; Brown, J. L.; Carlstead, K.; Pukazhenthi, B.; Freeman, E. W.; Snider, R. J. (2015). "Multi-institutional survey of social, management, husbandry and environmental factors for the SSP African lionPanthera leopopulation: examining the effects of a breeding moratorium in relation to reproductive success". International Zoo Yearbook. 49: 198–213. doi:10.1111/izy.12073. ISSN 0074-9664.
- Nájera, Fernando; Brown, Janine; Wildt, David E.; Virolle, Laurie; Kongprom, Urarikha; Revuelta, Luis; Goodrowe-Beck, Karen (2015). "Body mass dynamics in hand reared clouded leopard (Neofelis nebulosa) cubs from birth to weaning". Zoo Biology. 34 (3): 239–243. doi:10.1002/zoo.21206. ISSN 0733-3188. PMID 25716685.
- Brown, Janine L. (2014). "Comparative Reproductive Biology of Elephants". Reproductive Sciences in Animal Conservation. Advances in Experimental Medicine and Biology. Vol. 753. pp. 135–169. doi:10.1007/978-1-4939-0820-2_8. ISBN 978-1-4939-0819-6. ISSN 0065-2598. PMID 25091910.
- Wicker-Thomas, Claude; Cikanek, Shawna J.; Nockold, Simon; Brown, Janine L.; Carpenter, James W.; Estrada, Angie; Guerrel, Jorge; Hope, Katharine; Ibáñez, Roberto; Putman, Sarah B.; Gratwicke, Brian (2014). "Evaluating Group Housing Strategies for the Ex-Situ Conservation of Harlequin Frogs (Atelopus spp.) Using Behavioral and Physiological Indicators". PLOS ONE. 9 (2) e90218. Bibcode:2014PLoSO...990218C. doi:10.1371/journal.pone.0090218. ISSN 1932-6203. PMC 3934986. PMID 24587290.
- Fernández, David; Doran-Sheehy, Diane; Borries, Carola; Brown, Janine L. (2014). "Reproductive characteristics of wild Sanje mangabeys (Cercocebus sanjei)". American Journal of Primatology. 76 (12): 1163–1174. doi:10.1002/ajp.22301. ISSN 0275-2565. PMID 24842495. S2CID 45340404.
