= Grace Brown =

Grace Brown may refer to

- Grace Brown (cyclist) (born 1992), Australian road cyclist
- Murder of Grace Brown (1886–1906), American factory worker whose life inspired characters in several novels
