= Jermaine Brown =

Jermaine Brown may refer to:

- Jermaine Brown (athlete) (born 1991), Jamaican sprinter
- Jermaine Brown (footballer, born 1983), English football midfielder
- Jermaine Brown (footballer, born 1985), Caymanian football goalkeeper
- Jermaine Brown, 1991 Kentucky Mr. Basketball and basketball player at the University of Tennessee, Georgetown College
