= Rebecca Brown =

Rebecca Brown may refer to:

- Rebecca Brown (swimmer) (born 1977), former Australian breaststroke swimmer
- Rebecca Brown (character), fictional character from the Australian drama Sea Patrol
- Rebecca Ore (Rebecca Brown, born 1948), American science fiction writer
- Rebecca Brown (author) (born 1956), American contemporary fiction writer
- Rebecca Brown (politician), American politician
- Rebecca Emerson-Brown, American politician
- Rebecca Jane Brown (born 1992), British Trichotillomania spokesperson and vlogger
- Rebecca Latham Brown (fl. 1980s–2010s), American law professor
- Rebecca Brown Burton (1940–2023), American romance writer

== See also ==
- Beca Brown, Welsh politician
- Rebekah Brown, Australian academic
