= Mitch Brown =

Mitch Brown, Mitchell Brown or Mitchel Brown may refer to:

- Mitch Brown (rugby league) (born 1987), Australian rugby league player
- Mitch Brown (snowboarder) (born 1987), New Zealand Olympic snowboarder
- Mitchell Brown (rugby union) (born 1993), New Zealand rugby union player
- Mitch Brown (footballer, born 1988), Australian rules footballer with the West Coast Eagles
- Mitch Brown (footballer, born 1990), Australian rules footballer player with Melbourne
- Mitchel Brown (born 1981), Honduran footballer
