= Warren Brown =

Warren Brown may refer to:

- Warren Brown (actor) (born 1978), English actor
- Warren Brown (cartoonist) (born 1965), Australian cartoonist and TV presenter
- Warren Brown (politician) (1836–1919), American politician
- Warren Brown (sailor) (1929–2014), Bermudian Olympic sailor
- Warren Brown (sportswriter) (1894–1978), American sportswriter
- Warren Brown (television host), American television host on the Food Network
- Warren C. Brown, American professor of history in California
- Warren G. Brown (1921–1987), American rodeo bull rider known as "Freckles Brown"
- Warren S. Brown (born 1944), American neuropsychologist, professor and researcher
- Warren Brown, American political activist and plaintiff, see Clyde cancer cluster
