= Edwin Brown (disambiguation) =

Edwin Brown (1898–1972) was an Australian rugby league player.

Edwin Brown may also refer to:

- Edwin Thomas Brown (born 1938), Australian expert in rock mechanics
- Edwin Brown (naturalist) (died 1876), English naturalist and entomologist
- Edwin J. Brown (1864–1941), mayor of Seattle 1922–1926
- Eddy Brown (1926–2012), full name Edwin Brown, English footballer
