= Andre Brown (volleyball) =

Canadian volleyball player (born 1990)

Personal information
- Nationality: Canadian
- Born: August 24, 1990 (age 36); Mississauga, Ontario
- Height: 2.06 m (6 ft 9 in)
- Weight: 104 kg (229 lb)

Volleyball information
- Position: Middle Blocker
- Current club: Chicago Icemen

Career
| Years | Teams |
|---|---|
| 2012–2014; 2015–2016; 2016–2017; 2017–2018; 2018–2020; 2020–2021; 2021–2022; 2022–2023; 2023–2024 | (Canada) Humber College (Sweden) Orkelljunga VK (Finland) Team Lakkapaa (Germany) TSV Herrsching (Portugal) Sporting CP (Greece) Foinikas Syros (Greece) PAOK Thessaloniki (Germany) VfB Friedrichshafen (United States) Chicago Icemen |

Andre Brown (born August 24, 1990) is a Canadian volleyball player who plays for the American club Chicago Icemen.
