= Olivia Brown (disambiguation) =

Olivia Brown, is an American actress.

Olivia Brown may also refer to:

- Olivia Carnegie-Brown (born 1991), British rower
- Olivia Sanchez Brown, Chicana artist
