= Tyler Brown =

Tyler Brown may refer to:

- Tyler Brown (American football) (born 2005), American football player
- Tyler Brown (footballer) (born 1999), Australian rules footballer
- Tyler Brown (ice hockey) (born 1990), Canadian ice hockey player
- Tyler Brown (racing driver) (born 1999), American stock car racer
- Tyler Jamal Brown, or Tyla Yaweh (born 1995), American rapper and singer
