= Adrian Brown =

Adrian Brown may refer to:

- Adrian Brown (archivist) (born 1969), British archivist specializing in digital records preservation
- Adrian Brown (baseball) (born 1974), American baseball player
- Adrian Brown (journalist), Australian television reporter
- Adrian Brown (musician) (born 1949), British musician
- Adrian Brown (cricketer) (born 1962), former English cricketer
- Adrian John Brown (1852–1919), British professor of malting and brewing at the University of Birmingham
- Adrian Brown (director) (1929–2019), British theatre, television director and poet
