= Lou Brown =

English singer-songwriter

Lou Brown (born 1978) is an English singer-songwriter who received the 2003 Southwest's Young Achiever of the Year Award and took part in the Prince's Trust's "Soundlive" programme, where she was offered the opportunity to learn skills from professional working musicians, and subsequently won a grant from the Trust to fund her first major album project. In addition to releasing two albums, What Are You Singing About (2006) and Calm the Rising Waters (2010), she performed at Glastonbury Festival 2009 and appeared on BBC Radio 2's Wake Up to Wogan.

A native of the Dorset seaside resort town of Bournemouth, Lou Brown describes herself as a folk artist and, in his March 2009 Folk World review of What Are You Singing About, Adolf Goriup wrote that "Lou is a wonderful singer with a soft voice and a great feeling for rhythm, which she proves with the outstanding opening song 'Morning Light'", concluding the write-up with, "Lou Brown has recorded an album that is really worth listening to... I’m sure you’ll like it." The album received airplay on regional UK radio stations such as Wave 105, Original 106 in Southampton and Bristol, Forest FM, BBC Radio Bristol, BBC Radio Gloucestershire, BBC Southern Counties Radio, BBC Somerset and BBC Radio Solent. After years of gigging extensively around the UK, she took the album to America in 2008, playing a series of dates in Chicago and Iowa. Back in the UK, she played support slots for Hazel O'Connor, Paul Young, Boo Hewerdine, Albert Lee, Clive Gregson, and Steve Tilston. Her 29 June 2009 national radio debut on BBC Radio 2's Wake Up to Wogan came about in the aftermath of the Glastonbury Festival appearance. In 2010, her second album, Calm the Rising Waters, produced by Clive Gregson, was released.
