= Wendy Brown (disambiguation) =

Wendy Brown (born 1955) is an American professor of social science at the Institute for Advanced Study.

Wendy Brown may refer to:

- Wendy Brown (sprinter) (born 1950), New Zealand sprinter
- Wendy Brown (heptathlete) (born 1966), retired heptathlete from the United States
- Wendy Brown, political activist and plaintiff (see Clyde cancer cluster)
