= Bud Brown (baseball) =

American baseball player

- Outfielder

Negro league baseball debut
- 1918, for the Homestead Grays

Last appearance
- 1922, for the Homestead Grays

Teams
- Homestead Grays (1918, 1921–1922)

Bud Brown was an American Negro league outfielder between 1918 and 1922.

Brown played in parts of three seasons for the Homestead Grays between 1918 and 1922. In five recorded games, he posted two hits in 12 plate appearances.
