= Logan Brown =

Logan Brown may refer to:

- Logan Brown (activist), British trans rights activist, blogger, and residential children's support worker
- Logan Brown (ice hockey) (born 1998), American ice hockey player
- Logan Brown (American football) (born 2001), American professional offensive tackle
