= Cliff Brown =

Cliff Brown may refer to:

- Cliff Brown (American football) (1952–2012), former American football quarterback for the University of Notre Dame
- Cliff Brown (soccer) (born 1956), American soccer goalkeeper
- Clifford Brown (1930–1956), American jazz trumpeter
- Clifford Brown (director) (1916–1993), British television editor and director
- Clifford F. Brown (1916–2011), American judge
