= Nancy Brown =

Nancy Brown may refer to:

- Nancy J. Brown, American physician-scientist
- Nancy Elizabeth Brown (born 1952), US Navy admiral
- Nancy Brown (actress) (1909–2003), Australian actress, singer and songwriter
- Nancy Brown (columnist) (1870–1948), American advice columnist
- Nancy Brown (Kansas politician) (1942–2020), American state legislator from Kansas
- Nancy Marie Brown (born 1959), American author
- Nancy Brown (musical), Broadway musical inspired by the song by Clifton Crawford
- Nancy Brown (song), a popular song by Clifton Crawford which was performed by Marie Cahill in the 1902 musical The Wild Rose

== See also ==
- Nancy Browne (1913–1996), New Zealand cricketer
