= Preston Brown =

Preston Brown may refer to:

- Preston Brown (United States Army officer) (1872–1948), American general
- Preston Brown (wide receiver) (born 1958), American football player
- Preston Brown (linebacker) (born 1992), American football player
