= Kelly Brown (disambiguation) =

Kelly Brown (born 1982) is a Scottish male rugby footballer.

Kelly Brown may also refer to:

- Kelly Brown (actress), American actress
- Kelly Brown (cricketer) (born 1973), New Zealand cricketer
- Kelly Williams Brown (born 1984), American writer and author
- Kelly Brown (gymnast) (born 1965), Canadian gymnast
- Kelly Brown (drag racer), American Top Fuel drag racer
- Kelly Brown, Miss Montana USA, 1994

== See also ==
- Keely Brown (born 1993), Canadian curler
- Keely Brown (goaltender) (born 1976), Canadian goaltender
