= Vanessa Brown (disambiguation) =

Vanessa Brown (1928–1999) was an Austrian-born American actress.

Vanessa Brown may also refer to:

- V V Brown (born 1983), British indie pop singer-songwriter, model and record producer
- Vanessa L. Brown (born 1966), Democratic member of the Pennsylvania House of Representatives who was convicted of bribery
