= Oliver Brown =

Oliver or Ollie Brown may refer to:

- Oliver Brown (American activist) (1918–1961), plaintiff in the case Brown v. Board of Education
- Oliver Brown (baseball) (1849–1932), American baseball player
- Oliver Brown (footballer) (1908–1953), English footballer, also known as Buster Brown, active in the 1930s
- Oliver Brown (snooker player) (born 1994), English snooker player
- Oliver C. Brown (born 1946), American percussionist
- Ollie Brown (baseball) (1944–2015), Major League Baseball player
- Ollie E. Brown (born 1953), American drummer and record producer, half of duo Ollie & Jerry
- Oli Brown (born 1990), British blues musician
- Oliver Brown (died 1859), son of abolitionist John Brown
- Oliver Brown (Scottish activist) (1903–1976), Scottish nationalist activist
- Ollie Brown (racing driver) (born 1983), British racing driver
- Oliver Brown (captain) (1753–1846), Captain in the Continental Army during the American Revolutionary War
- Oliver Brown (British Army officer), British general
