= Randy Brown =

Randy Brown may refer to:

- Randy Brown (baseball) (1943–1998), American baseball catcher
- Randy Brown (basketball) (born 1968), American retired basketball player
- Randy Brown (fighter) (born 1990), Jamaican-American mixed martial artist
- Randy Brown (musician) (1952–2025), American R&B musician
- Randy Brown (politician) (born 1967), American politician, former mayor of Evesham Township

== See also ==
- J. Randall Brown (1851–1926), American mentalist
