= Edgar Brown =

Edgar Brown may refer to:

- Edgar Allan Brown (1888–1975), legislator from South Carolina
- Edgar William Brown (1859–1917), American physician and businessmen
- Edgar George Brown (1898–1954), American tennis player, union organizer, and politician
- Edgar O. Brown (1880–1937), American football coach
- Edgar H. Brown (1926–2021), American mathematician

== See also ==
- Edgar Brown Memorial Stadium, a high school stadium in Washington
