= Ivor Brown (footballer) =

English footballer

Personal information
- Full name: Ivor Ronald John Brown
- Date of birth: 1 April 1888
- Place of birth: Shardlow, England
- Date of death: 1966 (aged 77–78)
- Place of death: Swansea, Wales
- Position: Centre forward

Senior career*
Years	Team	Apps	(Gls)
- Ripley Town
1909–1911	Tottenham Hotspur	12	(0)
- Coventry City
- Reading
- Swansea Town
- Porth Athletic
- * Club domestic league appearances and goals

Ivor Ronald John Brown (1 April 1888, in Shardlow – 1966) was a professional footballer who played for Tottenham Hotspur, Coventry City, Reading and Swansea Town.

== Football career ==
Brown began his football career at Ripley Town. The centre forward joined Tottenham Hotspur where he made 12 appearances between 1909 and 1911. After leaving the Spurs he had spells at Coventry City, Reading, first paid transfer to Swansea Town before ending his career at Porth Athletic.
