= Terry Brown (brothel owner) =

New Zealand brothel owner and criminal

- Born: Terry Rex Brown; 1956 or 1957
- Died: July 2025 (aged 68); Waikawa, Marlborough, New Zealand
- Occupations: Brothel owner; underworld kingpin
- Years active: 1990s–2000s

Terry Rex Brown (1956 or 1957 – July 2025) was a New Zealand brothel owner from Christchurch. Until 2010, he owned 12 sex venues located in Christchurch, including Charlie's Massage Lounge and the nightclub Voodoo Lounge.

== Biography ==
Before venturing into the sex industry, Brown was a fisherman. He was also involved in ostrich and deer farming, property development and stock cars and founded the Up, Up and Away company in 1998, which was reported as being an escort service, serving rural South Island communities by helicopter through the provision of strippers and "sexperts".

Brown came to public attention during the late 1990s, due to his connection with a high-profile criminal case. On 26 December 1996, a patron of the Wicked Willies strip club, Barry Coleman, was found unconscious in a doorway of the venue at around 3 am. It was later determined that Coleman had fallen down a flight of stairs. The owner of the venue, Gregory Mather, was charged with murder, but the charges were later reduced to manslaughter. Brown, who was an associate of Mather, was later charged with obstruction of justice after he and Mather allegedly contacted a police witness, in violation of court process. The charges were later dropped, and nobody else was prosecuted. Brown was allegedly connected to the Devil's Henchmen gang. Brown was loosely connected to the murder of Angela Blackmoore. Blackmoore worked at stripclubs owned by Brown, and had met her husband, William, while he was working as a bouncer at one of Brown's venues. In 2019, David Peter Hawken attempted to implicate Brown in the murder, saying Brown was responsible for "all the carnage in town" at the time the murder took place; Hawken was later convicted of Blackmoore's murder.

Brown was a high-profile owner of brothels in Christchurch. Prior to the 2010 Canterbury earthquake, he owned 12 sex venues around the city, including Charlie's Massage Lounge and Voodoo Lounge nightclub. Both venues were firebombed in 2000. The same year, he was involved in the re-theming of the former Palladium Niteclub. Brown filed for bankruptcy in 2001 after failing to file tax returns and having outstanding tax debt for his businesses. In 2005, two years after prostitution was legalised in New Zealand, Brown successfully appealed to the High Court to quash a Christchurch City Council by-law that would have prevented brothels operating in the suburbs of the city. Justice Graham Panckhurst ruled that the by-law would have effectively made single owner-operated brothels (known as soobs) illegal within Christchurch, which he deemed to be unreasonable. The city council spent NZ$100,000 defending the by-law in court. In 2008, Brown trespassed Labour MP Clayton Cosgrove from three of his premises, despite Cosgrove vehemently asserting he had never visited the businesses. The two reportedly had a feud over disagreement about a shared office car park in Kaiapoi, and Cosgrove's work to outlaw BZP party pills, which Brown sold from some of his businesses.

Brown announced he would stand for the mayoralty of Waimakariri District Council in 2007, though this never eventuated.

After the Canterbury earthquakes, Brown sold his interests in Christchurch and moved north to live in Waikawa, near Picton. In 2010, he was convicted of owning unlicensed firearms and fined $400. He was aged 53 at the time. In 2013, Brown purchased a hydroslide from Timaru District Council, and announced he had plans to install the hydroslide at the Picton waterfront to "revitalise" the area. The plans never eventuated and the hydroslide was resold to a sharemilker from Geraldine in an auction in 2015.

In 2013, Brown told Stuff that he "might become a consultant to the sex industry [in Christchurch], but [will] see what the city looks like before [he] go[es] back and reinvest[s]." In 2014, he told Stuff that he was planning to return to the sex industry. Brown said that "following the [Canterbury] quakes and the influx of construction workers for the rebuild, there was more demand than ever for sex workers."

Brown died in July 2025. After his death it was revealed that he had recently been found guilty of two charges of doing an indecent act, for touching a 15-year-girl inappropriately and taking sexually suggestive photos of her at his Picton home.
