= George Washington Brown =

George Washington Brown is a pseudonym used by two musicians:

- Pete Gofton (born 1975), English musician and producer
- Van Dyke Parks (born 1943), American composer, arranger, producer, musician, singer, and actor

== See also ==
- George Washington Browne (1853–1939), Scottish architect
- George Brown (disambiguation)
