= Janet Brown (disambiguation) =

Janet Brown (1923–2011) was a Scottish actress, comedian and impressionist.

Janet Brown may refer to:

- Janet H. Brown, American executive director of the Commission on Presidential Debates in the U.S.
- Janet Brown (murder victim) (1944–1995), English nurse murdered in 1995
- Janet Brown Guernsey (1913–2001), American professor of physics

== See also ==
- Janet Browne (born 1950), British historian of science
