= Blair Brown (disambiguation) =

Blair Brown (born 1946) is an American theater, film and television actress.

Blair Brown may refer to:

- Blair Brown (American football) (born 1994), American football player
- Blair Brown Lipsitz (born 1988), American writer, mental performance consultant, former volleyball player and coach
