= Tina Brown (disambiguation) =

Tina Brown (born 1953) is an English journalist, magazine editor, columnist, broadcaster, and author.

Tina Brown may also refer to:

- Tina Brown (rower) (born 1968), American rower
- Tina Brown (runner) (born 1976), British runner
- Tina Lasonya Brown (born 1970), convicted of the murder of Audreanna Zimmerman
