= Godfrey Brown =

Godfrey Brown may refer to:

- Godfrey Brown (politician) (c. 1838–1928), British businessman and politician of Hawaii
- Godfrey Brown (athlete) (1915–1995), British Olympic gold medallist
