= Roger Brown =

Roger Brown or Browne may refer to:

== Arts and entertainment ==
- Roger Brown (songwriter), American singer-songwriter from Texas, formerly on Decca Records
- Roger Brown (artist) (1941–1997), American artist and Imagist
- Roger Aaron Brown (born 1949), American character actor
- Roger Browne (1930-2024), American actor

== Sports ==
- Roger Brown (defensive tackle) (1937–2021), American football player
- Roger Brown (defensive back) (born 1966), American football player
- Roger Brown (basketball, born 1942) (1942–1997), American basketball player in the ABA, member of Basketball Hall of Fame
- Roger Brown (basketball, born 1950) (1950–2023), American basketball player in the ABA and NBA
- Roger Brown (cricketer) (born 1959), Australian first-class cricketer
- Roger Brown (footballer) (1952–2011), English footballer
- Roger Brown (rower) (born 1968), British Olympic rower

== Others ==
- Roger Brown (colonel) (1749–1840), American soldier
- Roger Brown (psychologist) (1925–1997), American social psychologist
- Roger D. Brown, American politician from Texas
- Roger H. Brown (born 1956), American business executive and academic administrator
- Roger W. Brown (1940–2009), American lawyer and judge
- Roger Browne (priest) (died 1601), English priest, Canon of Windsor
