= Edmund Brown =

Edmund Brown or Browne may refer to:

- Pat Brown (Edmund Gerald Brown, Sr., 1905–1996), the 32nd Governor of California
- Jerry Brown (Edmund Gerald Brown, Jr., born 1938), Pat Brown's son and the 34th and 39th Governor of California
- Edmund Browne (born 1937), Irish trade unionist
- Edmund John Browne, Baron Browne of Madingley (born 1948), member of the House of Lords and businessman
