= Adam Brown =

Adam Brown may refer to:

== Politics ==
- Adam M. Brown (1826–1901), American politician
- Adam Brown (Canadian politician) (1826–1926), Canadian politician and merchant
- Adam Brown (Illinois politician) (born 1986), Republican member of the Illinois General Assembly
- Adam Brown of Blackford (c. 1660–1711), Scottish merchant and Lord Provost of Edinburgh

== Sports ==
- Adam Brown (ice hockey) (1920–1960), Canadian ice hockey player
- Adam Brown (rugby union) (born 1987), Welsh rugby player
- Adam Brown (swimmer) (born 1989), British freestyle swimmer
- Adam Brown (footballer) (born 1995), Scottish footballer for St. Mirren

== Other ==
- Adam Brown (actor) (born 1980), English actor, comedian and pantomime performer
- Adam Brown (music educator) (born 1981), American music educator
- Adam Brown (shipwright), American shipbuilder
- J. Adam Brown (born 1983), Canadian actor

== See also ==
- Adam Brown Crosby (1856–1921), Canadian politician
- Adam Brown Littlepage (1859–1921), American lawyer and politician
- Adam Browne (born 1963), Australian speculative fiction writer
- Sir Adam Browne, 2nd Baronet (c. 1626–1690), English politician
