= Louise Brown (disambiguation) =

Louise Brown (born 1978) is an English woman and the first human born after in vitro fertilisation (IVF).

Louise Brown or Browne may also refer to:

- Louise Browne (born 1952), Trinidadinian cricketer
- Louise Brown (historian) (1878–1955), American historian of Britain
- Louise Brown (politician) (born 1980), Danish politician
- Louise Brown (tennis) (1922–2003), Canadian tennis player
- Louise Brown Verrill (1870–1948), American composer
- Louise Tanner Brown (1883–1955), American businesswoman
