= Rosemary Brown =

Rosemary Brown may refer to:

- Rosemary Brown (Canadian politician) (1940–2003), first black woman to be elected to a provincial legislature in Canada
- Rosemary Brown (spiritualist) (1916–2001), English composer, reportedly a transcriber of the musical works of deceased composers
- Rosemary Brown (born 1950), birth name of the singer and Irish presidential candidate Dana Rosemary Scallon
- Rosemary Brown (swimmer) (born 1961), Australian swimmer
- Rosemary Brown (American politician) (born 1970), Republican member of the Pennsylvania House of Representatives
- Rosemary Fowler (née Brown, born 1926), British physicist

== See also ==
- Rose Browne (1897–1986), African-American engineer, educator and author
- Brown (last name)
- Rosemary (first (given) name)
