= Theo Wade Brown =

British engineer

Theo Wade Brown (26 May 1950 – 30 April 2002) was an English carpenter, designer and engineer, and amateur musician.

Brown was a member of the London film special effects community, and one of the core team members at the Computer Film Company that won a Scientific and Technical Academy Award for developing digital film technology.

Brown later designed the Northlight film scanner for the Computer Film Company scanner division (now Filmlight), and was responsible not only for its engineering design, but also its 1920s-style marble and steel appearance—an artistic flourish that was characteristic of Brown's approach to life.

Brown suffered from bipolar disorder, which led eventually to his death.

In 2010, he was posthumously awarded a Scientific and Technical Academy Award for his work at Filmlight on the Northlight scanner technology.
