= Wesley Brown =

Wesley Brown may refer to:

- Wes Brown (born 1979), English football player
- Wesley A. Brown (1927–2012), first African-American to graduate from the U.S. Naval Academy
- Wesley E. Brown (1907–2012), U.S. District Court judge and oldest federal judge in American history at the time of his death
- Wesley Brown (writer) (born 1945), American writer based in Atlanta, Ga.
