= Travis Brown =

Travis Brown may refer to:

- Travis Brown (quarterback) (born 1977), American football quarterback
- Travis Brown (wide receiver) (born 1986), American football wide receiver
- Travis Brown (linebacker) (born 1990), American player of Canadian football
- Travis Brown (cyclist) (born 1969), American cyclist riding for the Trek Volkswagen Mountain Bike team

== See also ==
- Travis Browne (born 1982), American mixed martial artist
