= Shannon Brown (disambiguation) =

Shannon Brown may refer to:

- Shannon Brown (born 1985), American former basketball player
- Shannon Brown (singer) (born 1973), American country music artist
- Shannon Brown (New Zealand musician), bass player and vocalist for the New Zealand band 48May
