= Glen Brown (footballer) =

Australian rules footballer

Personal information
- Full name: Glen Brown
- Born: 3 January 1962 (age 64)
- Original team: Highett
- Height: 180 cm (5 ft 11 in)
- Weight: 83 kg (183 lb)
- Position: Forward / defence

Playing career^{1}
Years	Club	Games (Goals)
1982–85	St Kilda	31 (25)
- ^{1} Playing statistics correct to the end of 1985.

Glen Brown (born 3 January 1962) is a former Australian rules footballer who played with St Kilda in the Victorian Football League (VFL).
