= Wayne Brown =

Wayne Brown may refer to:

== Sportsmen ==
- Wayne Brown (ice hockey) (1930–2019), Canadian ice hockey player
- Wayne Brown (speedway rider) (1959–1991), New Zealand speedway rider
- Wayne Brown (snooker player) (born 1969), English snooker player
- Wayne Brown (footballer, born January 1977), English football goalkeeper
- Wayne Brown (footballer, born August 1977), English football defender
- Wayne Brown (footballer, born 1988), English footballer

== Politicians ==
- Wayne Brown (American politician) (1936–2013), American politician and accountant
- Wayne Brown (New Zealand politician) (born 1946), mayor of Auckland, health leader and businessman

== Other ==
- Wayne Brown (author) (1944–2009), writer born in Trinidad and Tobago
