= Bruce Brown =

Bruce Brown may refer to:

- Bruce Brown (basketball) (born 1996), American basketball player
- Bruce Brown (director) (1937–2017), American documentary filmmaker
- Bruce Brown (rugby union) (born 1944), Australian rugby union player
- Bruce Brown (footballer) (born 1951), Australian rules footballer
- Bruce Alan Brown (fl. 1970s–2010s), American musicologist
