= Pamela Brown =

Pamela Brown is the name of:

- Pamela Brown (actress) (1917–1975), English actress
- Pamela Brown, actress daughter of Kentucky politician John Y. Brown, Sr. and passenger of the ill-fated balloon Free Life that attempted to cross the Atlantic in 1970
- Pamela Brown (writer) (1924–1989), British writer
- Pamela Brown (journalist) (born 1983), American television reporter and newscaster
- Pam Brown (born 1948), Australian poet
- Pam Brown (Nebraska politician) (1952–2011), Nebraska state senator
- Pam Brown (New Hampshire politician), New Hampshire state legislator
- "Pamela Brown" (song), song by Tom T. Hall
