= Emily Brown =

Emily Brown, or Emilie Brown may refer to:

- Emilie Brown, also known as Emily Brown, American director, producer and voice actress
- Emily Brown Portwig (1896–1960), American clubwoman and pharmacist
- Emily Sophie Brown (1881–1985), American politician
- Emily Brown (ice hockey) (born 1998), American ice hockey player
- Emily Brown (runner) (born 1984), American steeplechase runner, 2006 All-American for the Minnesota Golden Gophers track and field team

== See also ==
- Emil Brown, American baseball player
- Emily Browning, Australian actress
