= Moses Brown (disambiguation) =

Moses Brown (1738–1836) was an American abolitionist and industrialist.

Moses Brown may also refer to:

- Moses Brown (basketball) (born 1999), American basketball player
- Moses Brown Ives (1794–1857), American businessman and philanthropist
- Moses Browne (1704–1787), English poet and clergyman
- Moses Brown House, house in Maryland, US
- Moses Brown School, a school in Rhode Island, US
