= Brenda Brown =

Brenda Brown may refer to:

- Brenda Mock Brown (born 1978), American college basketball coach
- Brenda Sue Brown (1955–1966), American murder victim, see killing of Brenda Sue Brown
