= John Robert Brown =

John Robert Brown may refer to:

- John Robert Brown (Virginia politician) (1842–1927), United States representative from Virginia
- John Robert Brown (judge) (1909–1993), member of the United States Court of Appeals for the Fifth Circuit, noted for his key decisions in favor of civil rights
- John Robert Brown (British Columbia politician) (1862–1947), lawyer and politician in British Columbia, Canada

== See also ==
- John Brown (disambiguation)
