= Lyn Brown (disambiguation) =

Lyn Brown (born 1960) is a British politician.

Lyn Brown may also refer to:

- Lynne Brown (born 1961), South African politician
- Monica Lin Brown (born 1988), US Army soldier and Silver Star recipient
- Lindsay Brown (baseball) (1911–1967), American baseball player
- Lyn Mikel Brown (born 1956), American academic, author, feminist, and youth activist
