= Rod Brown =

Rod Brown may refer to:

- Rod Brown (basketball) (born 1978), American basketball player
- Rod Brown (gridiron football) (born 1963), American football player
- Rod Brown (soccer) (born 1964), Australian former soccer player

== See also ==
- Rod Brown of the Rocket Rangers, an American outer space adventure TV series
- Rodney Brown (disambiguation)
