= Millie Brown =

Millie Brown may refer to:

- Millie Brown (footballer) (born 2001), Australian rules footballer
- Millie Brown (performance artist) (born 1986), English performance artist
- Millie Bobby Brown (born 2004), British actress
- Police Constable Millie Brown, a character from British television series The Bill

== See also ==
- Millicent Browne (1881–1975), British suffragette
