= Audrey Brown =

Audrey Brown may refer to:

- Audrey Brown (athlete) (1913–2005), British Olympic sprinter
- Audrey Brown (golfer) (born 1945), Welsh amateur golfer
- Audrey Brown (journalist), South African broadcast journalist
- Audrey Brown-Pereira (born 1975), Cook Islands diplomat, public servant and poet
- Audrey Alexandra Brown (1904–1998), Canadian poet
- Audrey McLaughlin (née Brown, born 1936), Canadian politician
