= Foxy Brown =

Foxy Brown may refer to:

- Foxy Brown (film), a 1974 blaxploitation film
- Foxy Brown (rapper) (born 1978), stage name of American hip-hop emcee Inga Marchand
- Foxy Brown (singer) (active since 1989), stage name of Jamaican dancehall reggae singer Jennifer Esmeralda Hynton
