= Maxine Brown =

Maxine Brown may refer to:

- Maxine Brown (country singer) (1931–2019), American country singer
- Maxine Brown (soul singer) (born 1939), American soul singer
- Maxine D. Brown, American computer scientist
