= Curtis Brown (disambiguation) =

Curtis Brown (born 1956) is a former NASA astronaut.

Curtis Brown may also refer to:

- Curtis Brown (outfielder) (born 1945), American left fielder for the Montreal Expos
- Curtis Brown (first baseman) (1923–1999), American first baseman for the New York Black Yankees
- Curt Brown (baseball) (born 1960), American former Major League pitcher for California and Montreal
- Curtis Brown (cornerback) (born 1988), American football cornerback
- Curtis Brown (running back, born 1954) (1954–2015), American former running back for the Buffalo Bills
- Curtis Brown (running back, born 1984), American former Brigham Young running back
- Curtis Brown (ice hockey) (born 1976), Canadian ice hockey player
- Curtis Brown (agency), firm of literary agents based in London, UK
- Curtis Don Brown (born 1958), American serial killer
