= Justin Brown (author) =

New Zealand author

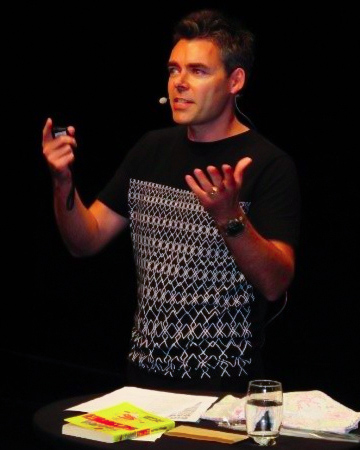
- Born: December 6, 1973 (age 52); Hāwera, New Zealand
- Writing career
- Pen name: Justin Christopher (children's books)
- Years active: 1995–present
- Genres: Non-fiction, humour, travel and children's fiction
- Notable works: Bowling Through India; Shot, Boom, Score! Kiwi Speak

Justin Brown, also known as Justin Christopher, (born 6 December 1973) is a New Zealand best-selling author, television producer, music writer, podcast host and former radio presenter. He is best known for his works in non-fiction, humour, travel and children's fiction.

His 2013 fiction novel, Shot, Boom, Score! made it to the Storylines Children's Literature Foundation of New Zealand Notable Books List in 2014. Brown has also previously produced theatre.

As noted by New Zealand Nielsen Book Data, Kiwi Speak was a weekly bestseller in 2018.

== Early life ==
Justin was born in Hāwera, New Zealand. His family moved to the Kāpiti Coast during his childhood years. Brown started his career delivering fridges, which led to bar work. He then volunteered at Radio Lollipop at The Starship Children's Hospital in Auckland, New Zealand. Early author influences of his were Maurice Sendak, Tin Tin, Roald Dahl and Asterix.

== Career ==
=== Early radio career: 1995-2018 ===
Brown began his career working as a radio host in 1995 at More FM in Auckland, New Zealand to then hosting a breakfast show at GWR FM in the United Kingdom in 1996. From 2000 to 2016, Brown was a Breakfast host on the Andrew, Jacque and Justin show on Classic Hits, Auckland.

From 2016 until 2018, Brown was a nationwide drive host for The Hits, New Zealand.

=== Writing career: 2002-present ===
In 2001, Brown wrote an article for the New Zealand magazine, Metro. This led to him writing his first non-fiction book, UK on a G-String which was published in 2002 by Random House New Zealand. He followed this up in 2004 with Teed Off in the USA which was also published by Random House New Zealand. In 2009, Brown completed his three travel books with Bowling Through India.

In 2009, Brown published You're a Real Kiwi When which was published by Hurricane Press New Zealand. Brown published several books relating to pop culture slang in New Zealand. These included, Cricket Speak which was released in 2007, Rugby Speak in 2011 and then Kiwi Speak in 2018.

From 2020, Brown published several children's books under the pen name, Justin Christopher. These included Freakout Island, The Underers, My Best Worst Year, Stowaway Daze and Nanas with No Manners.

=== TV and film career: 2009-present ===
From 2000 until 2008, Brown was a host for the New Zealand music channel Juice TV. From 2009 until 2013, Brown was a writer on several episode for the New Zealand Children's TV series, Buzzy Bee.

In 2020 Brown was a writer and story producer for the Bravo New Zealand series, The Circus. In the same year he was also a writer and producer for the New Zealand series, Great Southern Truckers. In 2021, Brown was a writer for the series Uncharted New Zealand.

== Selected publications ==
- 2002 - UK on a G-String ISBN 9781840243796 (Random House New Zealand)
- 2004 - Teed Off in the USA ISBN 9781869416096 (Random House New Zealand)
- 2007 - The Signature Series with Joy Cowley ISBN 9781877454547
- 2009 - Bowling Through India ISBN 9781869791551 (Random House New Zealand)
- 2009 - You're a Real Kiwi When ISBN 9780986452222 (Hurricane Press New Zealand)
- 2010 - Myth New Zealand ISBN 9780986452239 (Hurricane Press New Zealand)
- 2013 - Shot, Boom, Score! ISBN 9781743313688 (Allen & Unwin)
- 2018 - Kiwi Speak ISBN 9781869790226 (Random House New Zealand)
- 2022 - Stowaway Daze (as Justin Christopher) (Browns Ink) ISBN 978-0473593308
- 2023 - Nanas with No Manners (as Justin Christopher) (Scholastic New Zealand Ltd) ISBN 9781775438045

== Music credits ==
- 2012 - Kiwiana goes pop - Good Keen metrosexual (Universal Music) (as Justin Brown's Myth New Zealand)
- 2013 - Kiwiana goes pop. Vol. 2. - A great place to bring up the kids (Frenzy Music) (as Justin Brown's Myth New Zealand)
