= Alistair Brown =

Alistair Brown may refer to:

- Ali Brown (born 1970), English cricketer
- Alistair Brown (footballer, born 1951), Scottish footballer (Leicester City, West Bromwich Albion)
- Alistair Brown (footballer, born 1957), Scottish footballer (Dumbarton FC)
- Alistair Brown (footballer, born 1985), Scottish football goalkeeper (Hibernian FC)
