= Dominique Brown (influencer) =

American Disney influencer (1989/1990–2024)

- Born: November 12, 1990
- Died: December 5, 2024 (aged 34); Los Angeles, California, U.S.
- Occupation: Social media influencer

Dominique Brown (November 12, 1990 – December 5, 2024) was an American social media influencer.

== Biography ==
Brown was based in Long Beach, California. She was a Senior Design Manager in the Consumer Products Division at The Walt Disney Company. She was known for being a social media influencer under the screen name "HellooDomo".

Brown was co-founder of Black Girl Disney, an online community dedicated to making the Disney influencer space "more inclusive to people of color". She did so alongside fellow content creator Mia Von after noticing a lack of representation in Disney influencers. Brown was considered a pillar in the Black Disney creator community. Brown had 22,000 followers on Instagram.

She was a regular at Disneyland-hosted influencer events and was invited by Disney to the premiere of Moana 2 at the El Capitan Theatre in Los Angeles.

On December 5, 2024, Brown died in Los Angeles after experiencing a medical emergency at an event hosted by BoxLunch. She was 34. It was reported that Brown had been reassured by staff that the food was safe for her to consume prior to her suffering a deadly allergic reaction. The company announced they would be conducting an independent investigation.

Brown's brother Patrick Ramos announced her death in a comment posted on her final Instagram post. Those who paid tribute to Brown included Anika Noni Rose who voiced Princess Tiana in The Princess and the Frog.
