= Taylor Brown =

Ty, Tay, Tyler or Taylor Brown may refer to:

== Politicians ==
- Taylor Brown (attorney), American attorney and New York City official
- Taylor G. Brown (1890–1957), American state senator from Wisconsin
- Taylor Brown (Montana politician), American state legislator elected in 2008

== Sportsmen ==
- Tay Brown (1911–1994), American football player
- Taylor Brown (basketball) (born 1989), American power forward
- Tyler Brown (ice hockey) (born 1990), Canadian left winger
- Tyler Brown (footballer) (born 1999), Australian rules midfielder
- Ty Brown, American sprinter in 2018 USA Outdoor Track and Field Championships

== Other ==
- Taylor Brown (writer) (born 1982), American writer
- Taylor Brown (Big Brother), contestant of Big Brother 28

== See also ==
- Quincy (actor) (born Quincy Taylor Brown, 1991), American actor, dancer, model, and singer
