= John Henry Brown (disambiguation) =

John Henry Brown (1820–1895) was an American historian.

John Henry Brown may also refer to:

- John Henry Hobart Brown (1831–1888), Episcopal Bishop
- John Brown (British Army soldier) (1908–1965), British prisoner of war
- Jack Brown (footballer, born 1899) (1899–1962), English football player

== See also ==
- John Henry Browne (born 1946), American attorney
- John Brown (disambiguation)
