= Ruth Brown (disambiguation) =

Ruth Brown (1928–2006) was an American singer-songwriter.

Ruth Brown may also refer to:

- Ruth Brown (librarian) (1891–1975), Oklahoma librarian and civil rights activist
- Ruth Snyder (1895–1928), née Brown, American executed for the murder of her husband
- Ruth Brown (writer), born 1941, British author and illustrator of children's books (see Kate Greenaway Medal)
- Ruth Brown (album), an album by American vocalist Ruth Brown
- Ruth Brown, British r&b singer and contestant on the first series of The Voice UK
