= Stephanie Brown =

Stephanie Brown may refer to:

- Stephanie Brown (character), a supporting character in DC Comics Batman series who has used the alter egos "Spoiler", "Robin", and "Batgirl".
- Stephanie Brown Trafton (born 1979), U.S. discus thrower, 2008 Olympic champion
- Stephanie Brown (runner), winner of the 2014 distance medley relay at the NCAA Division I Indoor Track and Field Championships
- Stephanie Brown (sprinter), 3rd in the 4 × 110 yards relay at the 1979 AIAW Outdoor Track and Field Championships
