= Joyce Ann Brown =

Joyce Ann Brown (February 12, 1947 – June 13, 2015) was wrongfully convicted of robbery and murder in 1980 and spent almost a decade in prison before her conviction was overturned. Her case was notable because it was one of the first convictions that was overturned after extensive media exposure. Her case was featured on the television show 60 Minutes, and investigated by the print news media.

After Brown was released from prison she relocated to Dallas, and founded MASS, Mothers (Fathers) for the Advancement of Social Systems. MASS' mission is to assist wrongfully convicted prisoners, and help newly released prisoners transition back into society.

Brown, who died in June 2015, spent the remainder of her life supporting people who were wrongfully convicted and advocating for policy changes.
