= Jesse Brown (disambiguation) =

Jesse Brown (1944–2002) was the United States Secretary of Veterans Affairs under President Bill Clinton from 1993 to 1997.

Jesse Brown may also refer to:

- Jesse L. Brown (1926–1950), American naval aviator
- Jesse Brown (American football) (1902–1987), American football player
- Jesse Brown (baseball) (1914–1980), American Negro leagues baseball player
- Jesse Brown (journalist), Canadian journalist
- Jesse Brown (Indiana politician) (born 1986), American politician
