= Percy Brown =

Percy Brown may refer to:

- Percy Brown (art historian) (1872–1955), British scholar, artist and Indologist
- Percy Edgar Brown (1885–1937), soil scientist at Iowa State University
- Percy Brown (rugby league), English rugby league footballer who played in the 1920s
- Percy Shiras Brown (1883–1973), American management consulting engineer

== See also ==
- Percy Browne (1923–2004), English businessman, farmer, amateur jockey and Conservative Party politician
- Allan Percy Brown (1912–1994), boxer and politician in Saskatchewan, Canada
