= Neil Brown =

Neil Brown may refer to:

- Neil Brown (Australian politician) (born 1940), Australian lawyer and former Member of the Federal Parliament of Australia and Deputy Leader of the Liberal Party of Australia
- Neil Brown (Canadian politician) (born c. 1947), lawyer, biologist, Canadian politician and current Member of the Legislative Assembly of Alberta
- Neil Brown (figure skater) (born 1990), French ice dancer
- Neil Brown (footballer) (1952–2014), Australian rules footballer
- Neil Brown Jr. (born 1980), American actor

== See also ==
- Neal Brown (born 1980), American football coach
- Neal Brown (politician) (1861–1917), lawyer, Wisconsin politician, businessman, and writer
- Neill S. Brown (1810–1886), governor of Tennessee
