= Marilyn Brown =

Marilyn Brown may refer to:

- Marilyn Brown (actress) (1953–1997), American actress, sister of actors Barry and James Brown
- Marilyn Brown (author) (born 1938), American Mormon author
  - Marilyn Brown Novel Award
- Marilyn A. Brown, Georgia Tech professor focusing on energy and climate change policy
