= Norman Brown =

Norman Brown may refer to:

- W. Norman Brown (1892–1975), Indologist and Sanskritist
- Norman O. Brown (1913–2002), American philosopher and sociologist
- Norman E. Brown (1890–1958), sports editor of the Central Press Association
- Norman John Brown, 1985 recipient of the David Richardson Medal
- Norman Brown (cricketer) (1889–1962), Australian cricketer
- Norman Brown (curler) (born 1961), Scottish curler
- Norman Brown (footballer) (1885–1938), English footballer
- Norman Brown (guitarist) (born 1962), American jazz guitarist
- Norm Brown (1943–2022), Australian rules footballer
- Norm Brown (baseball) (1919–1995), American baseball player
- Norman Brown (motorcyclist) (1960–1983), Northern Irish motorcycle road racer
- Norman Cole Brown (1901–1996), founder of the Anchorage Daily News
- Norman K. Brown (born c. 1936), American man who has worked on seven consecutive United States Censuses
