= Jeannine Brown =

American New Testament scholar

Jeannine K. Brown is an American New Testament scholar who focuses on the Gospels, Hermeneutics and New Testament literary analysis. She is a professor at Bethel University in Saint Paul, Minnesota.

== Education ==
Brown earned a Bachelor of Music at the University of Wisconsin–Eau Claire in 1984. She then went on to complete her Master of Divinity at Bethel Seminary in 1991 and her Ph.D. at Luther Seminary in 2001.

== Career and research ==
Brown has held various academic and ministry positions throughout her career. She has been a professor of New Testament at Bethel Seminary since 1995. Her primary areas of research and study have included biblical hermeneutics and the Gospels, particularly Matthean studies. Her first book, Scripture as Communication, was originally published in 2007; the second edition was released in 2021. Other areas of research have included Philippians, 1 Peter, and interdisciplinary work with colleagues in the area of social sciences and theology.

In addition to her research and writing, Brown has been a member of the Committee on Bible Translation since 2010, which revises the NIV translation of the Bible. Brown has also been involved in numerous academic organizations, including the Society of Biblical Literature. She has published articles in numerous books and in journals, such as the Journal of Biblical Literature, New Testament Studies, and Catholic Biblical Quarterly.

== Books ==
- Philippians: An Introduction and Commentary. Tyndale New Testament Commentaries. Revised Edition. Downers Grove, IL: IVP Academic, 2022.
- Scripture as Communication: Introducing Biblical Hermeneutics. Second Edition. Grand Rapids: Baker Academic, 2021.
- The Gospels as Stories: Narrative Approaches to Matthew, Mark, Luke and John. Grand Rapids: Baker Academic, 2020.
- Matthew (Two Horizons New Testament Commentary). With Kyle Roberts. Grand Rapids: Eerdmans, September, 2018.
- Relational Integration of Psychology and Christian Theology: Theory, Research, and Practice. With Steven J. Sandage. New York: Routledge, 2018.
- Matthew (Teach the Text Commentary Series). Grand Rapids: Baker, 2015.
- Dictionary of Jesus and the Gospels. 2d ed. Edited by Joel B. Green, Nicholas Perrin, Jeannine K. Brown. Downers Grove, IL: InterVarsity Press, 2013.
- The Baker Illustrated Bible Commentary. Rev. ed. Edited by Andrew E. Hill and Gary M. Burge. Grand Rapids: Baker Book House, 2012.
- Becoming Whole and Holy: An Integrative Conversation about Christian Formation. With Carla M. Dahl & Wyndy Corbin Reuschling. Grand Rapids: Baker Academic, 2011.
- Scripture as Communication: Introducing Biblical Hermeneutics. Grand Rapids: Baker Academic, 2007.
- The Disciples in Narrative Perspective: The Portrayal and Function of the Matthean Disciples. SBL Academia Biblica 9. Atlanta: Scholars Press, 2002. Co-published by Brill, 2002.
