= Gus Brown =

Gus Brown may refer to:

- Gus Brown (actor) (born 1974), English actor and comedian
- Gus Brown (rugby union) (born 2004), New Zealand rugby union player
- R. M. Brown, (1885–1927), American football, basketball, and baseball coach

== See also ==
- Gus Malietoa-Brown (born 1975), Western Samoa rugby league footballer
