= Gillian Brown =

Gillian Brown may refer to:

- Gillian Brown (diplomat) (1923–1999), British diplomat
- Gillian Brown (linguist) (born 1937), British linguist
- Gillian Ruth Brown, British psychologist
- Gill Brown (born 1965), British Olympic hockey player
