= Ivadell Brown =

American musician, singer

- Born: Sturgis, Michigan, United States
- Occupations: Musician, vocalist, radio broadcaster
- Known for: Member of the Audition Board of the Hollywood Bowl
- Spouse: J. Edgar Brown

Ivadell Brown was an American musician and vocalist, on the Audition Board of the Hollywood Bowl.

== Early life ==
Ivadell Brown was born in Sturgis, Michigan, United States, the daughter of Frank W. Langley.

== Career ==
She was a musician and vocalist. She was the Music chairman of the Santa Monica Bay Woman's Club. She was on the Audition Board of the Hollywood Bowl. She was a radio broadcaster.

She was a member of the Los Angeles Cosmos and the Los Angeles Manana Club.

== Personal life ==
Ivadell Brown lived in Buffalo, New York, and moved to California in 1915 and lived at 125 Wavecrest Ave., Venice, California. She married J. Edgar Brown.
