= Lewis Brown (cricketer) =

English cricketer

Lewis Brown (12 March 1874 – 14 October 1951) was an English cricketer active from 1896 to 1903 who played for Leicestershire. He was born and died in Earl Shilton. He appeared in 62 first-class matches as a righthanded batsman who bowled right arm medium pace. He scored 1,660 runs with a highest score of 110 and took seven wickets with a best performance of three for 39.
