= Leon Brown =

Leon Brown may refer to:

- Leon Brown (baseball) (born 1948), American baseball outfielder
- Leon Brown (basketball) (1919–1990), American basketball player
- L. Carl Brown (1928–2020), emeritus professor of history at Princeton University
- Leon Brown (American football) (born 1993), American football guard
- Leon Brown (rugby union) (born 1996), Welsh rugby union player
- Leon Brown (sprinter) (born 1950), American sprinter, 1971 and 1972 winner of the 4 × 100 meter relay at the NCAA Division I Outdoor Track and Field Championships
