= Isaac Brown =

Isaac Brown may refer to:

- Isaac H. Brown (1812–1880), American sexton
- Issac Ryan Brown (born 2005), American actor
- Isaac Van Arsdale Brown (1784–1861), American educator and Presbyterian clergyman who founded the Lawrenceville School in New Jersey
- Isaac Brown (American football), American football player
- Isaac Brown (basketball) (born 1969), American basketball coach
- Isaac Brown (naval officer) (1817–1889), American naval officer in the US and Confederate navies
- Isaac Brown (Wisconsin pioneer), the 3rd mayor of Fond du Lac, Wisconsin
- Ike Brown (1942–2001), American baseball player
- Ike Brown (Canadian football) (born 1951)

== See also ==
- Isaac Brown House, a single-family home in Kalamazoo, Michigan
