= Edith Brown =

Edith Brown may refer to:

- Dame Edith Mary Brown (1864–1956), British medical missionary to India
- Edith Haisman, née Edith Eileen Brown (1896–1997), Titanic survivor
- Edith Charlotte Brown, a.k.a. Mrs Francis Brown (1876–1945), English novelist and great-niece of Jane Austen
- Edith Player Brown (1907–1999), American musician, artist, and arts educator
