= Alice Brown =

Alice Brown may refer to:

- Alice Brown (sprinter) (born 1960), American sprinter
- Alice Brown (ombudsman) (born 1946), Scottish academic
- Alice Brown (politician), Canadian politician
- Alice Brown (writer) (1857–1948), American novelist, poet and playwright
- Alice E. Brown (1912–1973), Alaskan Kenaitze tribal citizen, Indigenous rights activist
- Alice Dalton Brown (born 1939), American realist painter
- Alice Van Vechten Brown (1862–1949), American art historian

== See also ==
- Alice Brown Davis (1852–1935), Native American chief of the Seminole Tribe of Oklahoma
