= Robin Brown =

Robin Brown may refer to:

- Robin Brown (cricketer) (born 1951), Zimbabwean cricketer
- Robin Brown (journalist), Canadian journalist and radio presenter
- Robin Brown (politician) (born 1961), American politician
- Robin S. Brown, American psychoanalyst and academic
- Robin Isadora Brown, American scientist and queer history archivist
- A fictional character in the children's novel Merry Go Round in Oz

== See also ==
- Robin Browne (born 1970), Guyanese cricketer
- Brown Robin, a traditional English-language folk song
