= Roy Brown =

Roy Brown may refer to:

== Arts, music and entertainment ==
- Roy Brown (blues musician) (1920/25–1981), American blues musician who was a pioneer of rock and roll
- Roy Brown (Puerto Rican musician) (born 1945), Puerto Rican musician and folk singer
- Roy Brown (clown) (1932–2001), American clown, puppeteer and artist
- Roy Chubby Brown (born 1945), British comedian

== Business and industry ==
- Roy Brown Jr. (1916–2013), American designer of the Ford Edsel
- Roy Brown (businessman) (1946–2024), British businessman and engineer, chairman of GKN

== Politics ==
- Roy Brown (Manitoba politician) (1896–1961), politician in Manitoba, Canada
- Roy Brown (Montana politician) (born 1951), Montana state senator and gubernatorial candidate

== Sports ==
- Roy Brown (footballer, born 1917) (1917–2005), English footballer for Nottingham Forest, Wrexham and Mansfield Town
- Roy Brown (footballer, born 1923) (1923–1989), English footballer with Stoke City and Watford, the first black player to play for Stoke
- Roy Brown (footballer, born 1925) (1925–2004), English football full back with Darlington
- Roy Brown (footballer, born 1945), English football goalkeeper with Tottenham Hotspur, Reading, Notts County and Mansfield Town
- Roy Brown (ice hockey) (1880–1950), Canadian ice hockey player

== Others ==
- Roy Brown (RAF officer) (1893–1944), Canadian pilot who was credited with shooting down the Red Baron
- Roy W. Brown (born 1947), former president of the International Humanist and Ethical Union
