= Lisa Brown =

Lisa Brown may refer to:

- Lisa Brown (actress) (1954–2021), American actress
- Lisa Brown (artist) (born 1972), Lisa Michelle, American illustrator and children's writer
- Lisa Brown (boxer) (born 1971), Trinidadian boxer
- Lisa Brown (lawyer) (born 1960), White House staff secretary
- Lisa Brown (Washington politician) (born 1956), former member of the Washington State Senate, Chancellor of Washington State University Spokane and candidate for Congress
- Lisa Brown-Miller (1966–2025), American ice hockey player
- Lisa Brown (Michigan politician) (born 1967), Oakland County Clerk-Register and former member of the Michigan State House of Representatives
