= Dustin Brown =

Dustin Brown may refer to:

- Dustin Brown (ice hockey) (born 1984), American ice hockey player
- Dustin Brown (tennis) (born 1984), Jamaican-German tennis player
- Dusty Brown (born 1982), American baseball player
- Dusty Brown (1929–2016), American blues harmonicist, singer and songwriter
