= Karen Brown =

Karen Brown may refer to:

- Karen Brown (ballerina) (born 1955), American ballerina and artistic director
- Karen Brown (cricketer) (born 1963), Australian cricketer
- Karen Brown (field hockey) (born 1963), British hockey player
- Karen McCarthy Brown (1942–2015), American anthropologist
- Karen Brown (author), American short story writer, see The Best American Short Stories 2008
- Karen Brown, Republican candidate in the 2011 Philadelphia mayoral election
- Karen Brown, model and wife of late British and Irish actor Peter O'Toole
