= Woody Brown =

Woody Brown may refer to:

- Woody Brown (surfer) (1912–2008), American surfer and designer of the modern catamaran
- Woody Brown (actor) (born 1956), American actor
- Woody Brown (author) (born 1997), American author who is non-verbal and autistic
