= Martha Brown =

Martha Brown may refer to:

- Elizabeth Martha Brown (1811–1856), last woman to be publicly hanged in Dorset, England
- Martha Brown (figure skater), American figure skater
- Martha McClellan Brown (1838–1916), American social reformer, major leader in the temperance movement
