= Bonnie Brown =

Bonnie Brown may refer to:

- Bonnie Brown (American politician) (born 1942), West Virginia state legislator
- Bonnie Brown (Canadian politician) (born 1941), Canadian Member of Parliament
- Bonnie Brown (musician) (1938–2016), American singer
- Bonnie Blair Brown (born 1947), American actress
