= Miles Brown =

Miles Brown may refer to:

- Miles Brown (musician) (born 1978), Australian theremin player
- Miles Brown (gridiron football) (born 1997), American and Canadian football player
- Miles Brown (actor) (born 2004), American actor
