= Ricardo Brown (journalist) =

Cuban-born television journalist

Ricardo Brown is a Cuban-born American television journalist who lives in Miami, Florida. Currently, he hosts El Factor Brown, a nightly news commentary hourly show broadcast by WGEN-TV, Channel 8, in Miami.

== Career ==
Brown formerly worked as a reporter and assignment editor for English-language WVIT in Hartford, Connecticut, and as an international correspondent for Univision and Telemundo. He was news director for the HBC National (now called Univision Radio) newscast which aired over Telemundo.

Brown has covered major news events in over fifty countries in Latin America, Europe and Asia. He is a four-time Emmy Award winner. He was also news director for the Radio Unica network, a weekly columnist for the Terra USA Internet Site, and a daily commentator for PRISA's Grupo Latino de Radio.

Currently he also works as commentator in WLVJ-1040 AM in Miami (Actualidad 1040) with the Venezuela-born journalist Lourdes Ubieta Monday to Friday from 12:00 to 3:00 p.m.
