= Earl Brown =

Earl Brown may refer to:

- Earl Brown (baseball) (1900–1980), American professional baseball player, journalist and politician
- Earl Brown (coach) (1915–2003), American football and basketball player and coach
- Earl Brown (general) (1927–2020), United States Air Force general
- Earl Brown (basketball, born 1952), Puerto Rican former basketball player
- Earl Jolly Brown (1939–2006), American actor
- W. Earl Brown (born 1963), American actor

== See also ==
- Earle Brown (1926–2002), American composer
- Earle M. Brown (1926–1969), Virginia lawyer and member of the Virginia House of Delegates
- Earle Brown (Minnesota politician) (1879–1963), sheriff and candidate for governor
