= Troy Brown (disambiguation) =

Troy Brown (born 1971) is an American football coach and former player.

Troy Brown may also refer to:

- Troy Brown (basketball, born 1971), American former basketball player
- Troy Brown (footballer) (born 1990), Welsh footballer
- Troy Brown Jr. (born 1999), American basketball player
- Troy E. Brown (born 1971), American politician in Louisiana

== See also ==
- Troy Browns, defunct baseball team
