= Amanda M. Brown =

American immunologist and microbiologist

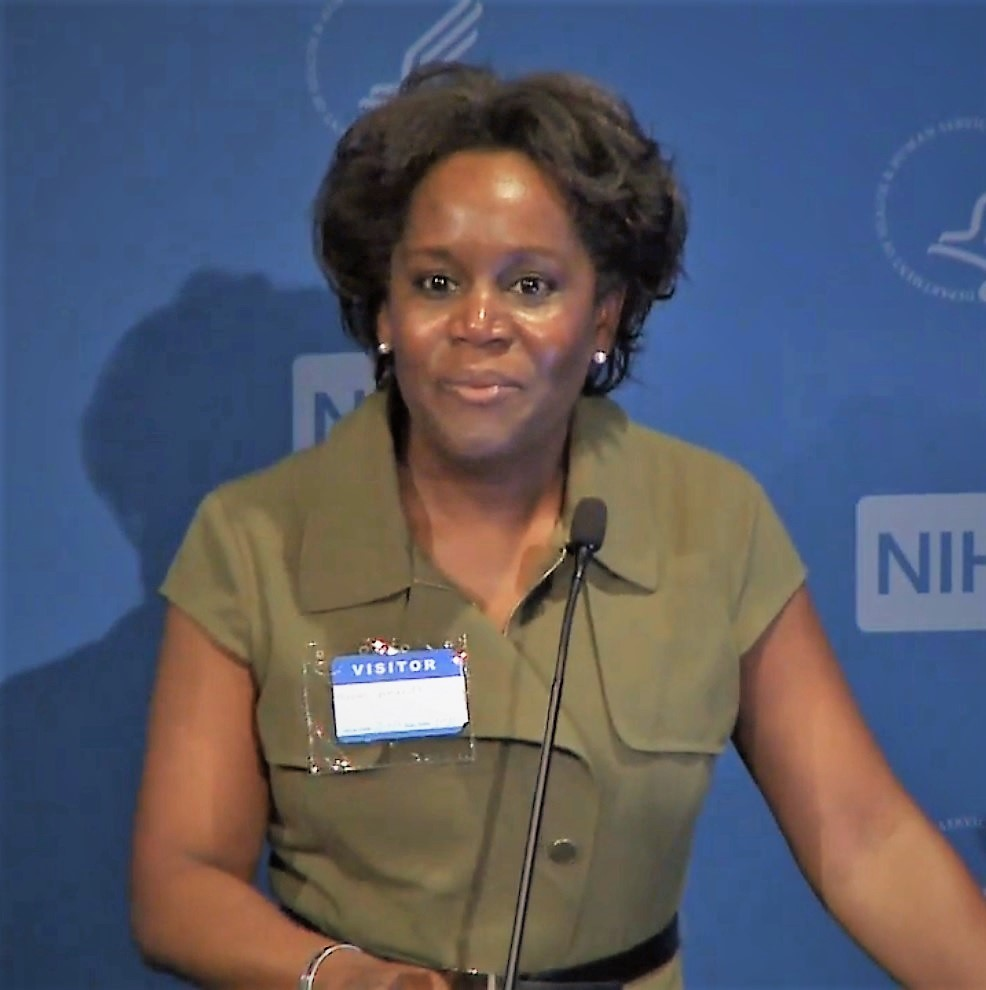
- Brown speaks at the National Institute of Neurological Disorders and Stroke in 2018
- Education: University of California, Riverside; Albert Einstein College of Medicine; Aaron Diamond AIDS Research Center
- Known for: First cloning of recombinant HIV virus with GFP tag
- Awards: 2018 Johns Hopkins University School of Medicine Living the Hopkins Mission Honor, 2014 Keystone Symposia on Molecular and Cell Biology Fellow, 2014 Johns Hopkins Diversity Leadership Award
- Scientific career
- Fields: Neuroimmunology
- Workplaces: Johns Hopkins University School of Medicine

Amanda Brown is an American immunologist and microbiologist as well as an associate professor of neurology and neuroscience at Johns Hopkins University School of Medicine in Baltimore, Maryland. Brown is notable for cloning one of the first recombinant HIV viruses and developing a novel method to visualize HIV infected cells using GFP fluorescence.

As a principal investigator at Johns Hopkins, Brown studies HIV in the central nervous system, focusing on the cellular role of osteopontin in regulating inflammatory signalling pathways in HIV infected macrophages. Brown also explores how microglia and macrophages serve as latent viral reservoirs in order to target these mechanisms to prevent HIV-associated neurocognitive disorder. In addition to her research, Brown mentors and recruits the future cohort of diverse leaders in STEM, serving as director of the Johns Hopkins Neuroscience Scholars Program, and for 10 years serving as program director for the Department of Neurology Johns Hopkins Internship in Brain Sciences Program for Baltimore City High School Students.

== Early life and education ==
Brown pursued her undergraduate degree at the University of California, Riverside in 1985. She majored in Biochemistry and graduated with a Bachelor of Science in 1989. After her undergraduate degree, Brown began her graduate studies at Albert Einstein College of Medicine, where she completed her PhD in microbiology and immunology. She studied under the mentorship of William R. Jacobs. During her PhD, she became interested in macrophage-pathogen biology and was selected to take a Cold Spring Harbor Course on Advanced Bacterial Genetics.

Brown helped to develop a novel method to study the mechanisms underlying mycobacterium replication in mononuclear phagocytes. Brown and her colleagues developed a leucine auxotrophic mutant that the field could use to study the host-pathogen interactions of mycobacterium and the animal cells thy replicate in. Brown also explored the sec-dependent protein export pathway in mycobacterium, the main protein export pathway into the cytoplasm, and discovered the presence of two homologues of the SecA protein. SecA1 they found to be essential, but SecA2 they found to be nonessential but conserved across mycobacteria suggesting its alternate and unknown roles in pathogenesis and mycobacterium physiology.

=== Development of recombinant HIV reporter tool ===
Brown completed her PhD in 1996, and continued to study intracellular pathogens that are able to evade the immune response. Brown pursued her postdoctoral training at the Aaron Diamond AIDS Research Center in New York City, where she studied under the mentorship of Cecilia Cheng-Meyer. During her postdoctoral studies Brown led the cloning of the first recombinant HIV virus that enabled the visualization of HIV infected cells by expressing green fluorescent protein. She later used this technology to explore the role of HIV protein Nef in pathogenesis, finding that Nef's interaction with cellular kinases enables the removal of CD4 from the surface of infected macrophages. Brown also used this fluorescent tool to discover that HLA-A2 is down-regulated in HIV infected macrophages. Further, Brown was the first to model the HIV-macrophage reservoir using her fluorescent tagging tool, and this method continues to be used today to study latent HIV infection.

From 1999 to 2003, Brown completed a second postdoctoral fellowship at Johns Hopkins University School of Medicine in Baltimore, Maryland. She worked under Suzanne Gartner in the Department of Neurology studying HIV infection in macrophages, with a focus on the infection of macrophages in the brain, namely microglia.

== Career and research ==
In 2007, Brown became an instructor in the Department of Neurology, and in 2010 Brown was appointed to the faculty at Johns Hopkins University School of Medicine, where she became an assistant professor of neurology in the Department of Neurology. In 2016, Brown was promoted to associate professor in the Department of Neurology. As the principal investigator of the Brown Laboratory Research Group, Brown explores how HIV infection persists in macrophages and how the chronic inflammatory response, as a result of infection, leads to neuronal damage and neurodegeneration.

=== Academic leadership ===
In addition to her research, Brown has held many leadership positions at Johns Hopkins School of Medicine. In 2015, Brown established the Neurosciences Community Innovation Council and became vice chair of the department. Brown is also the co-director of the Developmental Core for the NIMH Johns Hopkins Center for Novel Therapeutics for HIV-Associated Cognitive Disorders. During the COVID-19 pandemic, Brown was elected a member of the Johns Hopkins University School of Medicine Pandemic Academic Advisory Committee.

=== Education and outreach leadership ===
Brown also serves as a director of the Hopkins NeuroHIV-Comorbidities Scholars program and also Directs the Translational Research in Neuro-AIDS and Mental Health program at Johns Hopkins School of Medicine. Brown secured an R25 grant from the National Institutes of Health to run this program which educates research across the United States and internationally about the effects of HIV infection in racial and ethnic minority populations.

Brown was also the director of the Johns Hopkins Internship in Brain Sciences (JHIBS) Program, also supported by the NIH R25 grant that Brown obtained. The JHIBS program recruits underrepresented minority high school students in the Baltimore area to experience research as a paid intern for 8 weeks at JHSOM. Over 150 high school students have participated in the program throughout Brown's leadership tenure and the students have an 84% matriculation rate into college.

Brown, with the help of Tilak Ratnanather, founded the Johns Hopkins Neuroscience Scholars Program which helps to recruit and retain underrepresented minority students in neuroscience and is funded by the National Institutes of Neurological Disorders and Stroke. This national program focused on mentoring underrepresented and deaf or hard-of-hearing undergraduates to obtain career development and research exposure in neuroscience.

=== Osteopontin signalling in HIV infection of the central nervous system ===
Brown focuses her research program on studying the role of osteopontin in HIV pathogenesis in the central nervous system. Osteopontin is a pro-inflammatory cytokine that is secreted by the two main cells in the brain that HIV infects, namely T cells and macrophages. Brown found, in 2011, that osteopontin enhances HIV replication and is overall increased in the brains of HIV infected individuals. Further exploring its mechanisms of action, Brown discovered in 2020 that osteopontin may exert protective functions in the CNS through interacting with components of the extracellular matrix to active downstream protective signalling.

== Awards and honors ==
- 2018 Johns Hopkins University School of Medicine Living the Hopkins Mission Honor
- 2018 Provost Prize for Faculty Excellence in Diversity
- 2018 Nominated for Inaugural NINDS Story Landis Mentoring Award
- 2014 Keystone Symposia on Molecular and Cell Biology Fellow
- 2014 Johns Hopkins Diversity Leadership Award
