= Darrell Brown =

Darrell or Darell Brown may refer to:

- Darrell Brown (baseball) (born 1955), former Major League Baseball outfielder
- Darrell Brown (musician), American songwriter
- Darrel Brown (born 1984), sprinter from Trinidad and Tobago
- Darrel Brown (basketball) (1923–1990), American basketball player
