= Lloyd Brown =

Lloyd Brown may refer to:

- Lloyd Brown (baseball) (1904–1974), baseball pitcher, manager and scout
- Lloyd Brown (veteran) (1901–2007), one of the last surviving American World War I veterans and last member of the US Navy to have signed up before the German armistice
- Lloyd L. Brown (1913–2003), American labor organizer, Communist Party activist and writer
- Lloyd Brown (cricketer) (born 1995), South African cricketer
- Lloyd D. Brown (1892–1950), U.S. Army officer
- Lloyd O. Brown (1928–1993), lawyer and judge from Ohio
- Lloyd Brown (New Zealand lawyer) QC (1926–1988), represented Air New Zealand in the Mount Erebus inquiry
