= Vincent Brown =

Vincent Brown or Browne may refer to:

- Vincent Browne (born 1944), Irish journalist and broadcaster
- Vincent Browne (sculptor) (1947–2026), Irish sculptor
- Vincent Brown (historian) (born 1967), professor of history and of African and African American Studies at Harvard University
- Vincent Brown (lawyer) (1855–1904), Trinidadian lawyer
- Vincent Brown (linebacker) (born 1965), American football player and coach
- Vincent Brown (wide receiver) (born 1989), American football wide receiver
- Vincent Michael Brown (born 1971), English portrait artist
- Vincent T. Brown, community organizer and candidate in the United States House of Representatives elections in Michigan, 2010
- Vin Rock, (Vincent Brown, born 1970), American rapper
