= Sidney Brown =

Sidney or Sydney Brown may refer to:

- Sidney Brown (electrical engineer) (1873–1948), British electrical engineer and inventor
- Sidney Brown (footballer), English soccer goalkeeper
- Sidney Brown (accordion maker) (1906–1981), Cajun accordion maker
- Sidney Brown (American football) (born 1955), American football player
- Omen (record producer) (Sidney Brown, born 1976), Harlem music producer
- Sydney MacGillvary Brown (1895–1952), American World War I flying ace, author and professor of medieval history
- Sydney Brown (sport shooter) (1873–1945), Canadian Olympic sport shooter
- Sydney Brown (American football) (born 2000), American football player

== See also ==
- Sidney Browne (1850–1941), Matron-in-Chief
- Syd Brown (1917–1987), English cricketer active from 1937 to 1955
- Syd Brown (boxer) (died 1947), boxer from Jamaica
