= Roland Brown (disambiguation) =

Roland Brown, is an English barrister.

Roland Brown may also refer to:

- Roland Peter Brown (1926–2019), American physician
- Roland W. Brown (1893–1961), American paleobotanist
