= Malcolm Brown (cricketer) =

South African cricketer (born 1961)

Personal information
- Full name: Malcolm Edward Osborne Brown
- Born: 19 August 1961 (age 65); Durban, Natal, South Africa
- Batting: Right-handed
- Bowling: Right-arm medium

Domestic team information
- Years: Team
- 1988: Oxford University

Career statistics
Competition	First-class
Matches	3
Runs scored	71
Batting average	23.66
100s/50s	–/–
Top score	47
Catches/stumpings	–/–
- Source: Cricinfo, 26 January 2020

Malcolm Edward Osborne Brown (born 19 August 1961) is a South African former first-class cricketer.

Born at Durban in August 1961, Brown studied at Worcester College at the University of Oxford. While studying at Oxford, Brown made three appearances in first-class cricket for Oxford University against Lancashire, Gloucestershire, and Nottinghamshire in 1988. He scored 71 runs in his three matches, with a high score of 47. Brown also played rugby union for Oxford University RFC as a centre. After graduating from Oxford, he trained to become a chartered accountant. Starting at Barings Bank in 1989, he emigrated to Hong Kong in 1993 to work for the bank as their head of investment banking in Hong Kong, a position he held until 2004, at which point he became the head of corporate clients for Asia. He returned to Europe in 2008, assuming the position of global head of financial institutions. In October 2013, he was appointed as head of investor relations.
