= Ralph Brown (disambiguation) =

Ralph Brown (born 1957) is an English actor.

Ralph Brown may also refer to:

- Ralph Brown (sculptor) (1928–2013), British sculptor
- Ralph Brown (cornerback) (born 1978), American football player
- Ralph Brown (American football, born 1926) (1926–2016), American football player and coach
- Sir Ralph Kilner Brown (1909–2003), British Army officer, judge and athlete
- Ralph M. Brown (1908–1966), member of the California State Assembly
- Ralph S. Brown (1913–1998), American law professor
- Ralph Brown (footballer) (born 1944), English footballer
- Ralph Brown (politician) (1924–1999), Jamaican politician
- Ralph Brown, American actor who appeared in the 1981 slasher film Final Exam

== See also ==
- Ralph Browne, MP for Weymouth and Melcombe Regis
- Ralf Brown's Interrupt List, a comprehensive list of system internal information for x86 machines up to the year 2000
