= San Francisco Bay University =

Private university in Fremont, California, United States

Coordinates: 37.4778°N 121.9259°W

- Former name: Northwestern Polytechnic University (1984-2021)
- Type: Private university
- Established: January 2, 1984
- President: Nicholas Ladany
- Location: Fremont, California, United States
- Campus: Suburban
- Website: sfbu.edu

San Francisco Bay University, formerly Northwestern Polytechnic University, is a private, nonprofit university in Fremont, California, United States. Founded in 1984, the university awards bachelor's and master's degrees in computer science, engineering, technology and management programs.

It was founded by Ramsey Carter and Barbara Brown in 1984. George Hsieh served as the university’s president from 1991 to 2015.

== History ==
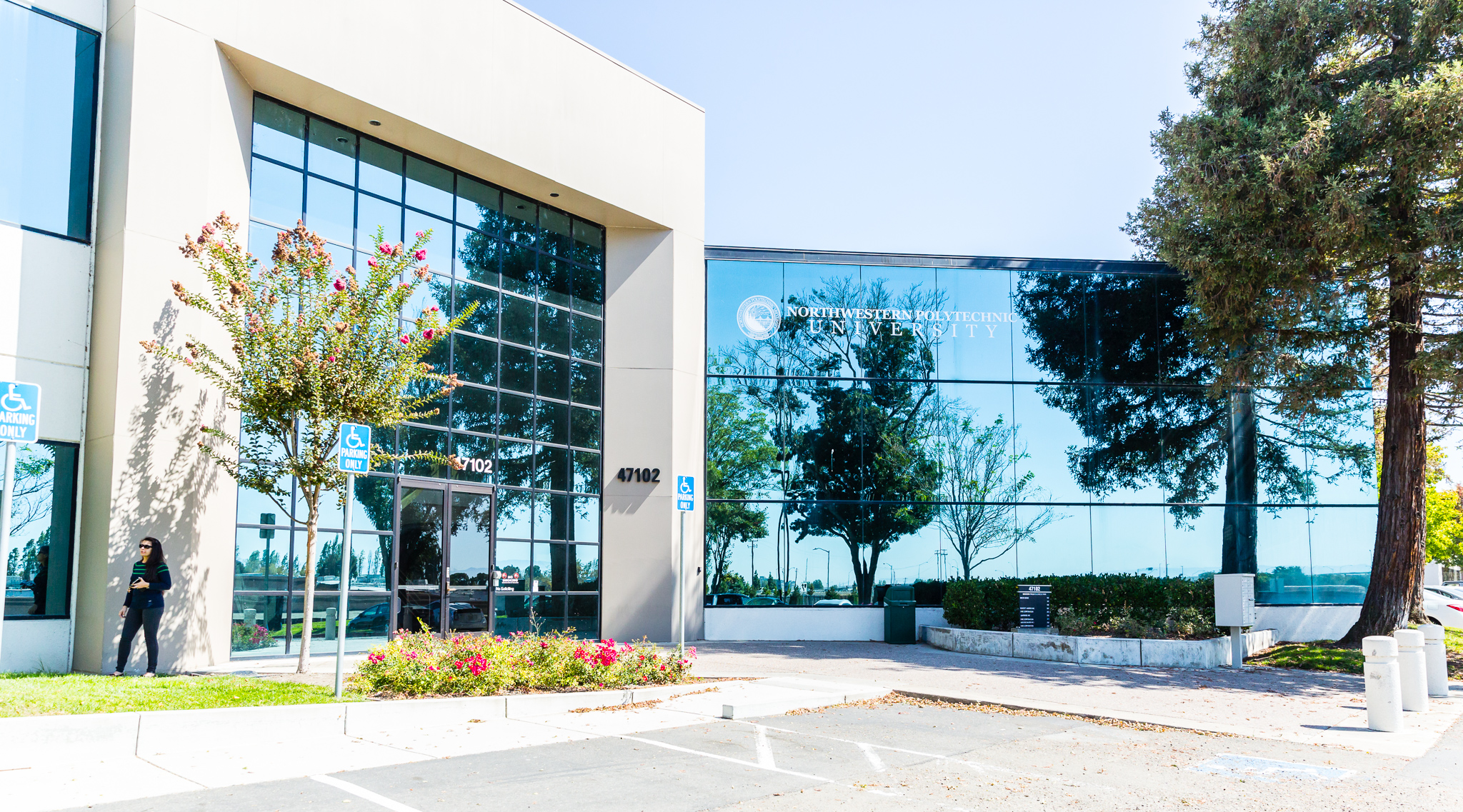
NPU North Building

Northwestern Polytechnic University (NPU) was founded by Ramsey Carter and Barbara Brown on January 2, 1984 and incorporated as a California public-benefit nonprofit corporation. The School of Engineering began granting Bachelor of Science degrees in electrical engineering in November 1984, followed by the Master of Science in electrical engineering in 1985. In 1987, NPU opened the Computer Systems Engineering programs at both the bachelor's and master's levels.

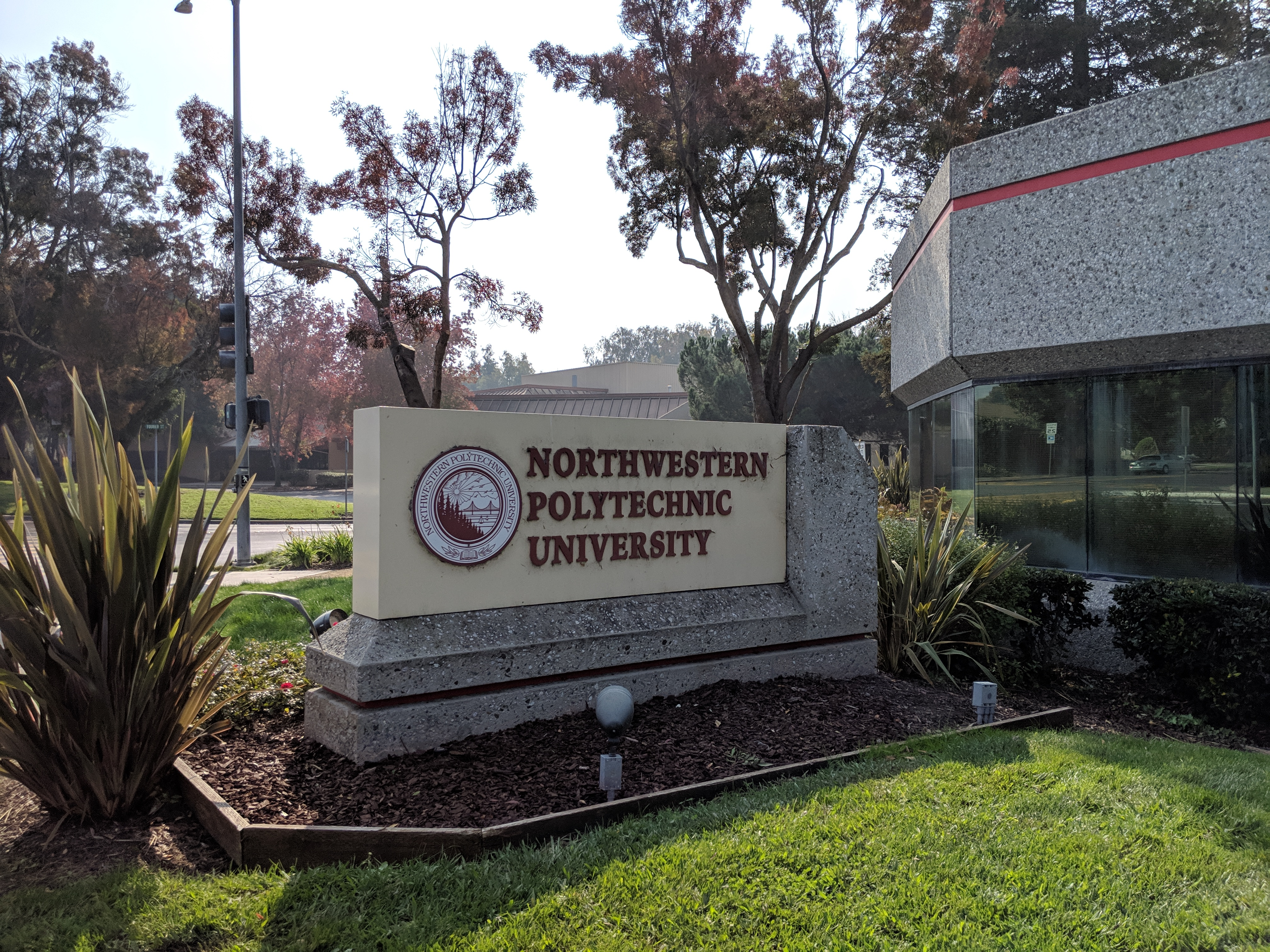
NPU Gateway

Two years later, on February 23, 1989 the university attained full institutional approval from the California Department of Education.

In 1995, NPU established its School of Business.

By Fall 1997, NPU had 400 students enrolled.

In 1991, George Hsieh began serving as NPU's president. He retired in 2015.

In 2016, a BuzzFeed News article questioned the operations of NPU during the period in its history in which a remarkable 99% proportion of international students, notably from India. The article claimed that the university did not perform due diligence in confirming prospective students' qualifications and inflated or falsified grades for students for the purposes of keeping them enrolled. This allowed students to work in the Bay Area's tech industry with a less cumbersome visa procedure while creating substantial tuition revenues for the school and for its family beneficiaries. During this time period, the university had no full-time, permanent faculty to serve its 6,000 students, and spent less than $1.5 million on the combined salaries of the school’s entire faculty and staff in 2014, while purchasing a house for this value that was occupied by its executive vice president and his family.

In April 2018, under ongoing allegations that it was a "visa mill," NPU's accrediting agency, the Accrediting Council for Independent Colleges and Schools (ACICS), warned that it would lose its accreditation if it failed to submit documentation about student demographics and student and employer satisfaction levels. ACICS had itself temporarily lost its recognition by the U.S. Department of Education following a 2016 report from Senator Elizabeth Warren that alleged that the agency had provided insufficient oversight to schools under its jurisdiction, ignored evidence of malfeasance, and accredited schools whose students were left with “astronomical debt levels and terrible outcomes.” ACICS renewed NPU's accreditation for four years in September 2018.

In January 2019, ACICS subjected NPU to a “compliance warning” because its 2018 student placement rate was just 56%, which did not meet ACICS' required threshold of 60%. ACICS advised NPU that it would lose accreditation if it failed to complete an improvement plan and submit quarterly reports. By June 2019, NPU had submitted a revised report stating that its placement rate was 72 percent, meeting ACIS' threshold, and ACICS removed the warning.

In 2021, NPU changed its name to San Francisco Bay University.

== Academics ==
In 2024, San Francisco Bay University introduced a new core curriculum called the Agility Praxis Pathway (APP), designed to enhance students' critical thinking and adaptability. The curriculum includes 10 courses that supplement degree-specific studies, focusing on diverse perspectives and key competencies identified by University academic leaders.

San Francisco Bay University offers the following degrees: Master of Business Administration, Master of Science, and Bachelor of Science.

NPU/San Francisco Bay University has been accredited continuously since 1998, presently by the WASC Senior College and University Commission (WSCUC/WASC).
