= Barrie Brown =

Australian rules footballer

Personal information
- Born: 25 June 1931
- Died: 13 October 2014 (aged 83)
- Debut: 1952, Richmond vs. Fitzroy, at Brunswick Street Oval

Playing career^{1}
Years	Club	Games (Goals)
1952	Richmond	2 (0)
- ^{1} Playing statistics correct to the end of 1952.

Barrie Brown (25 June 1931 – 13 October 2014) was an Australian rules football player. In 1952 he played two games with the Richmond Football Club in the Victorian Football League (VFL).
