= R. Malcolm Brown Jr. =

American biologist

Richard Malcolm Brown Jr. (Born January 2nd 1939) was an American biologist and botanist who served as the Johnson & Johnson centennial chair in plant cell biology at University of Texas at Austin. Dr. Brown attended the University of Texas at Austin and studied under Dr. Harold C. Bold. Dr. Brown majored in botany and received his PhD in Botany in 1964 before joining the UT Austin faculty as an assistant professor in 1965. Dr. Brown began teaching at the University of North Carolina at Chapel Hill in 1968 as an associate professor, and was promoted to a full professor in 1973. Dr. Brown returned to UT Austin in 1982 to serve as the inaugural holder of the Johnson & Johnson Centennial Endowed Chair in Plant Biology. Dr. Richard Malcolm Brown Jr. died on December 20th, 2025 at the age of 86.
