= Ted Brown =

Ted Brown may refer to:

- Ted Brown (activist) (born 1950), British LGBTQ rights activist
- Edwin Thomas (Ted) Brown (born 1938), Australian expert in rock mechanics
- Ted Brown (American football) (born 1957), American football player
- Ted Brown (Australian footballer) (1891–1958), Australian rules footballer for Carlton
- Ted Brown (saxophonist) (born 1927), American jazz tenor saxophonist
- Ted Brown (radio) (1924–2005), American radio personality
- Ted Brown (baseball), American baseball player
- Ted W. Brown (1906–1984), Ohio Secretary of State, 1951–1979
- Teddy Brown (1900–1946), American pop musician

== See also ==
- Edward Brown (disambiguation)
