= Brown (surname) =

Family name

Origin
- Meaning: 7th century Old English word "brun" or the Old Norse personal name "Bruni".
- Region of origin: Scotland, England, Ireland

Other names
- Variant form: See the bottom navigation box

Brown is an English-language surname in origin chiefly descriptive of a person with brown hair, complexion or clothing. It is one of the most common surnames in English-speaking countries. It is the most common surname in Jamaica, the second most common in Canada and the United Kingdom, and the fourth most common in Australia and the United States. It was first recorded in East Lothian in Lowland Scotland.

== Etymology and history of the surname ==
Most occurrences of the name are derived from a nickname concerning the complexion of an individual, the colour of their hair or the clothing worn. This nickname is derived from the Old English brun, brūn; Middle English brun, broun; or Old French brun. The root word is also sometimes found in Old English and Old Norse bynames, such as the Old Norse Brúnn; however these names were not common after the Norman Conquest (in 1066). In some cases, the Old English personal name Brun may be a short form of one of several compound names, such as Brungar and Brunwine.

Early recordings of the English name/surname are: Brun, Brunus in 1066; Conan filius Brun in 1209; Richard Brun, le Brun le mercer in 1111–38; William le Brun in 1169; William Brun 1182–1205; Hugh Bron in 1274; Agnes Broun in 1296; and John le Browne in 1318. Another of the earliest recorded Browns is John Brown of Stamford, Lincolnshire in 1312. In Scotland, The People of Medieval Scotland academic project surveys over 8600 extant records from between the years 1093 to 1314 and lists 26 Brouns and 14 Browns on its database.

The name also originates independently in the United States, as an Anglicization of other surnames, such as the German Braun, or other surnames with similar meanings. It can also arise as a translation from the Gaelic Donn ("brown"). The Mac A Brehon clan of County Donegal have anglicized as Brown or Browne since about 1800. In Scottish Gaelic, the name Brown is translated Mac-a-Bhruithainn (pronounced "mac-avroon") from the root word "Bruithainn", which is roughly pronounced "bro-an" and is similar to the word for judge (just as in the Irish). Its sound is very similar to the Scots surname Broun/Broon/Brown, which are all pronounced similarly.

The German cognates are associated with the much more common Continental personal name Bruno, which was borne by the Dukes of Saxony, among others, from the Tenth century or before. It was also the name of several medieval German and Italian saints, such as Saint Bruno of Cologne (1030–1101), founder of the Carthusian Order.

== See also ==
- List of people with surname Brown
- Brown (disambiguation), other things named Brown
