= Joshua Miele =

American research scientist specializing in accessible technology design (b. 1969)

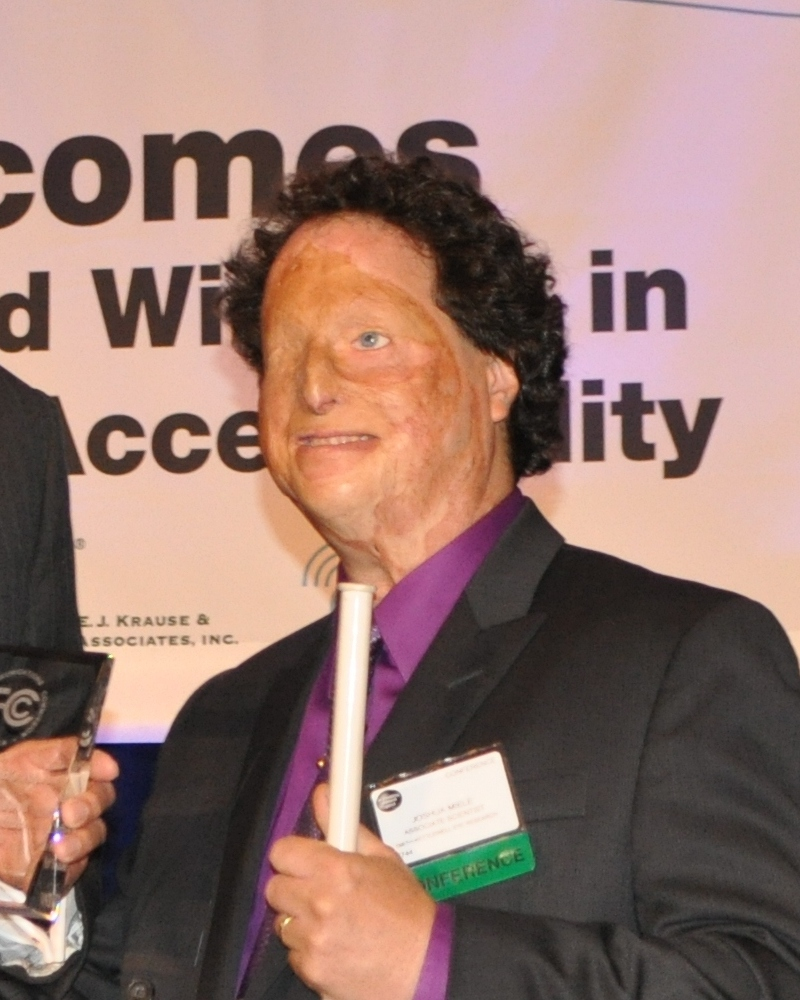
- Born: 1969 (age 56–57); New York, US
- Education: University of California, Berkeley
- Awards: MacArthur Fellowship (2021)
- Scientific career
- Fields: Accessibility
- Workplaces: Smith-Kettlewell Eye Research Institute (2003–2019); Amazon Lab126 (2019–present)
- Thesis: Human auditory perception of trajectories of motion in a simulated open-field environment (2003)
- Doctoral advisor: Ervin Hafter

Joshua A. Miele (born 1969) is an American research scientist who specializes in accessible technology design. Miele conducted research on tactile graphics and auditory displays at the Smith-Kettlewell Eye Research Institute (SKERI) in California for fifteen years. In 2019, he joined Amazon Lab126, a subsidiary of Amazon that works on hardware products, where he is Principal Accessibility Researcher. He has been blind since early childhood.

Miele's work at SKERI includes Tactile Map Automated Production (TMAP), a web application for generating tactile maps of streets printable with a braille embosser, and YouDescribe, a web platform for creating and listening to audio descriptions of YouTube videos. In 2014, he worked with the San Francisco-based nonprofit LightHouse for the Blind and Visually Impaired to start using TMAP to produce tactile maps of the Bay Area Rapid Transit for teachers and other consumers. He was named a MacArthur Fellow in 2021. His memoir, Connecting Dots, was published in 2025.

== Life and career ==
=== Early life ===
Joshua A. Miele was born in New York in 1969, the son of Isabella and Jean Miele and one of three siblings. At the age of four, he was blinded in an acid attack outside of the family home in Park Slope, Brooklyn, and he underwent surgeries for his burns and blindness through his childhood. He attended the Industrial Home for the Blind for kindergarten.

Miele recalls his mother wanted him to be "as active and engaged with the world as possible" growing up, and she encouraged him to feel art in museums. Electronics and model kits that his mother bought for his birthdays lacked accessible instructions, so he would attempt to build them through trial and error. His father worked as an architect. When he was six or seven years old, he would play with floor plans and layout tape in his father's office. After his parents separated in 1975, Miele spent much of his time with his sister.

In the first grade he was mainstreamed into Public School 102, where he was taught by the same teacher, from the third grade through high school, who transcribed all of his learning materials into braille. Miele and his sister later moved to Rockland County with their mother's new partner; he found that the suburban area was significantly harder to navigate as a blind person than Brooklyn, before he discovered how to use tactile maps. His stepfather, a geophysicist, would become a strong influence. He observed that, in this new environment, "most kids were afraid of me because I was different, and, for the first time in my life, I had classmates who thought it was fun to mess with the blind kid". In high school, he took classes in chemistry and biology and applied to study physics at the University of California, Berkeley in 1987.

=== Education ===
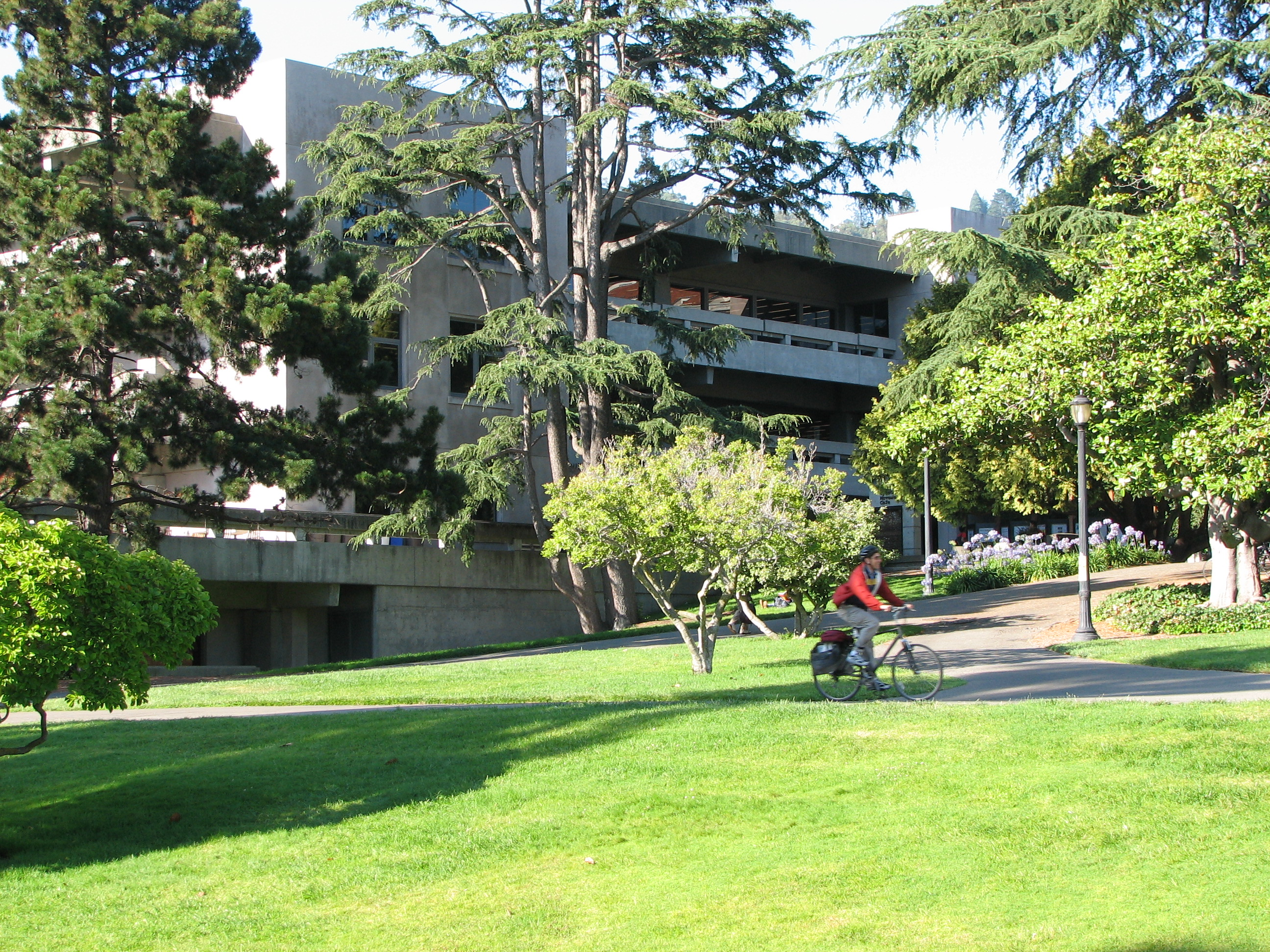
Miele said he gained an awareness of the "design and assumptions" of the world while studying at Berkeley's Moffitt Library (pictured).

Before moving to California for university, Miele's only significant encounter with other blind people was at a camp for blind youth in Vermont. At Berkeley, he studied with other visually impaired students and went through his studies almost without any negative interactions with professors. He spent time in a study center for blind students in the basement of Berkeley's Moffitt Library, nicknamed "The Cave", where he recalls gaining awareness of "design and assumptions" and seeing how design choices in the world were shaped by "ableist thought behind who's in control of the tools that we use, whether those tools are intersection controls or building entrances or computer technology." Initially desiring to be a rocket scientist, Miele took an internship at NASA. One semester prior to graduation, he paused his education to work at Berkeley Systems, then a start-up developing Macintosh computer software to be accessible to blind people; he was hired to perform software testing and technical support for their OutSpoken screen reader software and took on more responsibilities such as technical writing and marketing for the product.

Miele returned to university to finish his physics degree and completed a summer internship at the Smith-Kettlewell Eye Research Institute (SKERI) in San Francisco, where he designed and developed accessible technology for visually impaired people. When Berkeley Systems was sold in 1996, Miele debated whether he should start a company or pursue a PhD in policymaking. His mentor from SKERI, Bill Gerrey, recommended Miele work as a scientist and obtain a degree in experimental psychology instead. Miele then began a PhD in psychoacoustics at Berkeley. His studies focused on auditory motion perception—perception of the direction and speed in which sounds are traveling through hearing. Through his studies he worked with the numerical computation software package MATLAB to develop tools for reproducing graphical information created by MATLAB, such as bar charts, in auditory and tactile formats.

=== Career ===
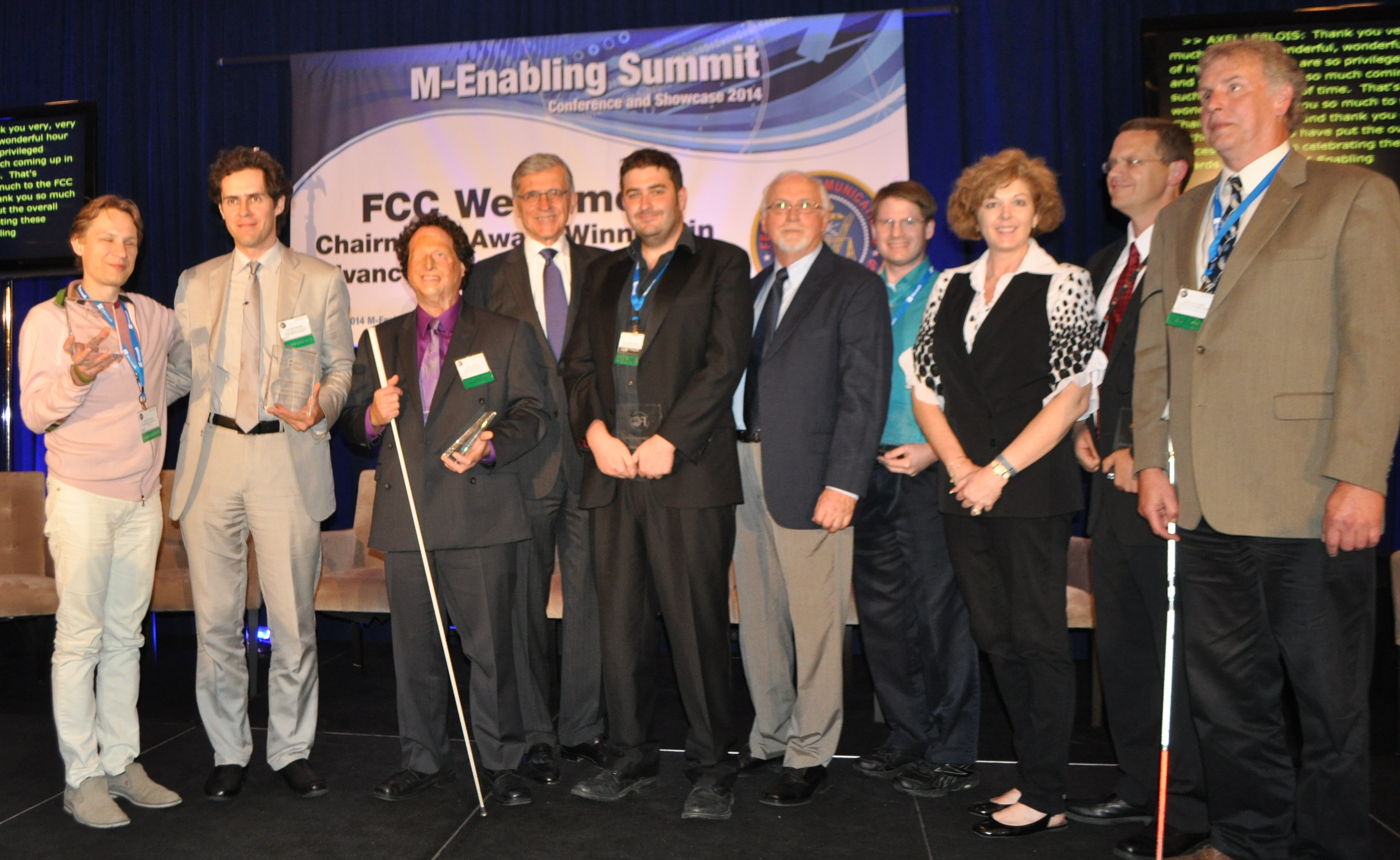
FCC chairman Tom Wheeler with award recipients at the 2014 FCC Chair's Awards for Advancement in Accessibility

Miele returned to SKERI under a predoctoral fellowship, and after earning his PhD in 2003, completed a postdoctoral fellowship which ultimately led to a full-time position as a scientist. He acted as a principal investigator on some of the organization's projects and was associate director of research and development from 2007 to 2019. Using funding from the U.S. Office of Special Education Programs, SKERI opened its Video Description Research and Development Center (VDRDC) in 2011, with Miele as its director. From 2011 to 2015, Miele served as president of the board of the LightHouse for the Blind and Visually Impaired, a nonprofit organization based in San Francisco. In 2014, the Federal Communications Commission (FCC) awarded Miele the FCC Chair's Award for Advancement in Accessibility.

Miele left SKERI at the beginning of 2019, after working for the organization for more than fifteen years, and joined Amazon Lab126 as Principal Accessibility Researcher. In this position, he has developed the usability of Amazon's website and devices for visually impaired people. Projects he has been involved with include braille and tactile interfaces for Amazon devices such as screen readers, tablets, and microwave ovens; the "Show and Tell" feature for Amazon Alexa, which identifies items the user holds up to the device; and audio descriptions for the streaming service Amazon Prime Video.

In 2021, Miele was awarded a MacArthur Fellowship for "Developing devices to enable blind and visually impaired people to access everyday technologies and digital information"; the award citation highlighted his Tactile Map Automated Production, WearaBraille, and YouDescribe projects. At a 2022 conference, he explained the prize money would be used to found a nonprofit organization, named the Center for Accessibility and Open Source, that would fund open-source projects for people with disabilities. Later in 2022, he was named a Distinguished Research Fellow in Disability, Accessibility, and Design at his alma mater Berkeley, to be working alongside professor Karen Nakamura.

In 2026, Miele founded the Center for Accessibility and Open Source (CAOS), a disability-led open-source organization. Its mission is to help improve the state of accessibility of open source software for people with disabilities, through encouraging the participation of people with disabilities in the software development process, establishing best practices, and usability testing.

=== Personal life ===
Miele lives in Berkeley, California, with his wife and two children. He plays the bass for services at a Jewish spiritual community in Berkeley. His older sister, Julie Miele Rodas, is a writer and professor at Bronx Community College, and his brother is a photographer. Rodas wrote an essay on Miele, titled "Limited Visibility; Or Confessions of a Satellite," which was published in the journal Pedagogy in 2015.

Until 2013, when The New York Times published a profile of Miele's early life and career, he was hesitant to have his story published, feeling as though it would let the day he was attacked as a child "dominate his life" rather than let him be recognized for his work. In 2025, Grand Central Publishing published Miele's memoir Connecting Dots: A Blind Life, written with journalist Wendell Jamieson, who wrote the 2013 profile of Miele in The New York Times.

== Research ==
=== Tactile graphics ===
External videos
- BART Tactile Mapping Project of the Blind, LightHouse for the Blind and Visually Impaired, 17:50, June 8, 2012

In 2003, while working at the Smith-Kettlewell Eye Research Institute, Miele began developing the Tactile Map Automated Production (TMAP) Project, a web application capable of producing tactile maps of streets suitable for printing with a braille embosser. Miele later worked with the LightHouse for the Blind and Visually Impaired to create tactile maps of the Bay Area Rapid Transit (BART). In developing the concept, Miele adapted a Livescribe digital pen to read off relevant information when the user taps a certain part of a tactile map, like which buses come through each bus stop. The LightHouse implemented Miele's concept through a four-year process which involved software design and testing, surveying transportation services, and building the maps. Distribution of the maps for use by teachers and other consumers began in 2014.

Maps produced with TMAP were featured in a 2018 exhibition at Cooper Hewitt, Smithsonian Design Museum. In 2018, the National Federation of the Blind presented LightHouse with its Dr. Jacob Bolotin Award for the development of TMAP.

=== Audio description ===
A major project of the Video Description Research and Development Center (VDRDC) was the development of YouDescribe, a website where volunteers can record accompanying audio descriptions for YouTube videos and view videos alongside the audio descriptions. To gauge the popularity of audio description and obtain feedback through focus groups, Miele and his research group attended meetings of the National Federation of the Blind and the American Council of the Blind in 2012.

The YouDescribe website was launched in 2014. That year, Miele began hosting the annual Describeathon, a one-day event held at SKERI during which people recorded audio descriptions. In a 2016 article on audio description in Representations, Berkeley professor Georgina Kleege discussed YouDescribe's benefits and potential pitfalls and her experience using the service with her students. According to SKERI, by May 2022, the service was set to have nearly 5,000 video descriptions at the end of the year.

=== Other projects ===
An early project at SKERI is WearaBraille, gloves that allow interaction with a smartphone by tapping braille on a hard surface. The WearaBraille functions wirelessly and can be used to send text messages, open applications, and answer phone calls. Miele also developed a basic iPhone application for blind wayfinding named overTHERE and in 2015 founded the Blind Arduino Project, a local group of blind students and hobbyists involved with the maker movement focused on designing their own technological devices.

== Selected publications ==
According to the Smith-Kettlewell Eye Research Institute website, Miele is a co-author of at least seven journal publications:

- Miele, Joshua A.; Hafter, Ervin R. (2002). "Trajectory perception in the free field". Journal of the Acoustical Society of America. 111 (5): 2356. Bibcode:2002ASAJ..111.2356M. doi:10.1121/1.4777916.
- Miele, Joshua A.; Landau, Steven; Gilden, Deborah (2006). "Talking TMAP: Automated generation of audio-tactile maps using Smith-Kettlewell's TMAP software". British Journal of Visual Impairment. 24 (2): 93–100. doi:10.1177/0264619606064436. S2CID 16459256.
- Seelman, Katherine D.; Palmer, Catherine V.; Ortmann, Amanda; Mormer, Elaine; Guthrie, O'Neil; Miele, Joshua; Brabyn, John (2008). "Quality-of-life technology for vision and hearing loss [Highlights of Recent Developments and Current Challenges in Technology]". IEEE Engineering in Medicine and Biology Magazine. 27 (2): 40–55. Bibcode:2008IEMBM..27b..40S. doi:10.1109/EMB.2007.907393. PMID 18463020. S2CID 28055925.
- Morash, Valerie S; Pensky, Allison E Connell; Miele, Joshua A (2013). "Effects of Using Multiple Hands and Fingers on Haptic Performance". Perception. 42 (7): 759–777. doi:10.1068/p7443. PMID 24344552. S2CID 8325678.
- Morash, Valerie S; Pensky, Allison E Connell; Tseng, Steven T W; Miele, Joshua A (2014). "Effects of Using Multiple Hands and Fingers on Haptic Performance in Individuals Who are Blind". Perception. 43 (6): 569–588. doi:10.1068/p7712. PMID 25154288. S2CID 21239436.
- Morash, Valerie S.; Siu, Yue-Ting; Miele, Joshua A.; Hasty, Lucia; Landau, Steven (2015). "Guiding Novice Web Workers in Making Image Descriptions Using Templates". ACM Transactions on Accessible Computing. 7 (4): 1–21. doi:10.1145/2764916. S2CID 632530.
- Abrahamson, Dor; Flood, Virginia J.; Miele, Joshua A.; Siu, Yue-Ting (May 2019). "Enactivism and ethnomethodological conversation analysis as tools for expanding Universal Design for Learning: the case of visually impaired mathematics students". ZDM. 51 (2): 291–303. doi:10.1007/s11858-018-0998-1. S2CID 52847229.
