= Morrison Heady =

American deafblind author

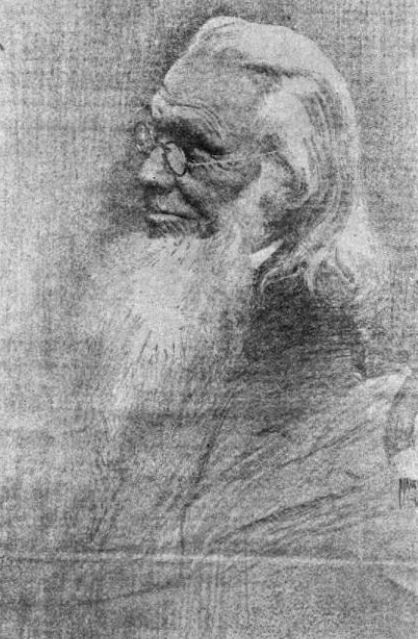
- Born: July 19, 1829; Elk Creek
- Died: December 19, 1915

James Morrison Heady (July 19, 1829 – December 19, 1915) was an American deafblind author. Heady published multiple volumes of children's books and poetry and was frequently referred to by the contemporary press as the "Blind Bard of Kentucky". He was one of the first advocates for books for the blind in the United States and he invented several devices to facilitate communication and improve quality of life for deaf and blind people.

== Early life and education ==
James Morrison Heady was born July 19, 1829, in Elk Creek, Kentucky. He was blinded in one eye in early childhood by a chip from a woodcutter's axe, and at age sixteen he lost sight in the other eye while playing with a schoolmate. His hearing was damaged after a fall from a horse as a child, worsening until he was completely deaf by the age of forty.

After losing his sight at sixteen, Heady attended the Kentucky School for the Blind for a year, then attended the Ohio State School for the Blind for another fourteen months. He learned to read embossed print and invented a "talking glove", a cotton glove with the letters of the alphabet printed at multiple places on the hand, using this tactile spelling to communicate with friends. He was largely self-educated through reading books and compiled one of the largest private collections of raised-type books in the United States.

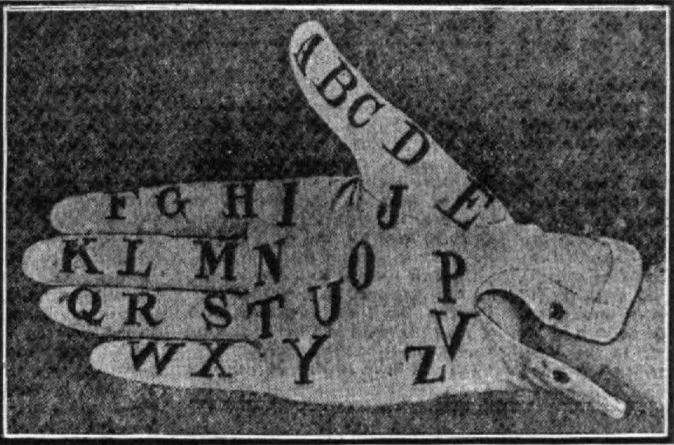
One of Heady's inventions, the "talking glove"

== Writing and advocacy for the deaf and blind ==
Heady developed a number of friendships with other deafblind people, including Helen Keller and Laura Bridgman. He also cultivated relationships with poet John Greenleaf Whittier, physician Simon Flexner, and legal scholar Lewis Naphtali Dembitz, each of whom read to Heady. He read Matilda Ziegler Magazine for the Blind and other periodicals in embossed print to keep informed about current affairs. In his 20s Heady traveled throughout the United States advocating for more books to be made available to the blind. In 1854 he began collecting monetary donations for the publication of Milton's Paradise Lost in embossed type. Heady inspired Dempsey Sherrod, a blind man from Mississippi, to raise funds for a national printing house for books for blind people, which was established as the American Printing House for the Blind. In 1860 Heady was appointed by the printing house's board to solicit donations for publishing raised-type books.

His literary career began when he would gather local schoolchildren to hear his stories about pioneer days; friends encouraged him to write and publish the stories. His first book, a children's biography of George Washington titled The Farmer Boy, and How He Became Commander-in-Chief, was written by Heady in 1864 under the pen name Uncle Juvinell; it sold over 8,000 copies. One of his most significant works was a book of verse titled The Double Night and Other Poems, which touched on autobiographical themes of loss. He wrote in multiple genres, including children's books, romantic verse, and philosophical poetry.

Heady devised several inventions in his lifetime, including several designed to make life easier for deaf and/or blind people. His inventions included a self-opening gate, a swivel chair, and a thermos to keep coffee warm. In the 1860s he built a hydraulic machine for raising water from wells and cisterns. Heady also created a working prototype of a steam-powered embossing press. Another of his inventions was the "diplograph", a typewriter that with the flip of a switch would type in one of three different embossed scripts used by the blind: Boston line letter, New York Point, or braille.

He left Spencer County in 1901, moving to Louisville. Heady finished his last two works at age 86, shortly before his death. He died December 19, 1915.

== Legacy ==
A biography of Heady's life, Beyond the Double Night, was written by Ken D. Thompson and published in 1996.

A historical marker was erected by the Kentucky Historical Society in 2004 in Heady's hometown of Elk Creek, with text reading:

The Blind Bard of Kentucky was blind by fifteen and deaf before forty. Neither condition limited his contributions. As friends read aloud, he embossed notes on the Diplograph machine he invented and built. He invented the Talking Glove with the alphabet printed on it so others could communicate by touching the letters. Heady's other inventions included the pull-chain home farm gate, furniture, utensils, and games. Built a steam-powered embossing press for American Printing House for the Blind, and wrote and published prose, poetry, and songs. Entombed with his parents in the Elk Creek Cemetery.

== Selected publications ==
- The Farmer Boy, and How He Became Commander-in-Chief. Boston : Walker, Wise, and Company, 1864
- Seen and Heard, Poems or the Like. Baltimore : H.C. Turnbull Jr., 1869
- Pleasant Pages and Bible Pictures for Young People. Boston : Henry A. Young and Co., 1869
- Burl. Nashville : Southwestern Methodist Publishing House, 1884
- The Double Night and Other Poems. Louisville : Courier-Journal Job Printing, 1901
- The Red Moccasins: A Story. Louisville : Courier-Journal Job Printing, 1901
