= Melville Brown =

Melville Brown may refer to:

- Sir Melville Richmond Brown, 3rd Baronet (1866–1944), English landowner
- Melville W. Brown (1887–1938), American film director
- Penny Melville-Brown (fl. 1970s–2020s), Royal navy veteran and blind activist
- Melville C. Brown (1838–1928), American politician and jurist

== See also ==
- Mel Brown (disambiguation)
- Brown (surname)
