= Melissa Brown =

Melissa Brown may refer to:

- Melissa Brown (politician), American politician
- Melissa Brown (tennis) (born 1968), American tennis player
- Melissa Brown (artist) (born 1974), American artist
- Melissa A. Brown, American diplomat
- Melissa J. Brown (born 1963), American anthropologist and historian

== See also ==
- Mel Brown (disambiguation)
