= Outspoken =

Outspoken may refer to:

- Outspoken (album), 2012 album by metalcore band For All Those Sleeping
- OutSpoken, screen reader software
- Outspoken Award, given by the International Gay and Lesbian Human Rights Commission
- Out-Spoken Press, British independent publisher hosting the Out-Spoken Prize for Poetry

== See also ==
- Parrhesia, the obligation to speak candidly in rhetoric
