= Melvin Brown =

Melvin Brown may refer to:

- Melvin Brown (footballer) (born 1979), Mexican footballer of Jamaican descent
- Melvin L. Brown (1931–1950), U.S. Army soldier who received the Medal of Honor
- Melvin R. Brown (born 1938), member of the Utah State House of Representatives
- Melvin Brown (American football) (1932–2018), American football coach and player
- Melvin Brown (music manager), American music manager
- Melvin Jerome Brown (born 1967), American chef

== See also ==
- Mel Brown (disambiguation)
