= Rose Resnick =

American philanthropist

- Rose Resnick, from a 1955 newspaper
- Born: November 27, 1906; New York City
- Died: August 14, 2006 (aged 99); San Francisco, California
- Occupations: Musician, educator, philanthropist

Rose Resnick (November 27, 1906 – August 14, 2006) was an American musician, educator, and philanthropist. She was co-founder and co-director of the Enchanted Hills Camp for the Blind in California, and a leader in San Francisco's blind community for decades.

== Early life and education ==
Rose Resnick was born in New York City, the daughter of Harris Resnick and Leah Resnick. Both of her parents were Jewish immigrants from Russia; her father sold cloaks and suits. She became blind from glaucoma in childhood. She studied music at the Manhattan School of Music and at the Fontainebleau Conservatory of Music in France, with Nadia Boulanger. She graduated from Hunter College in 1928. She later earned a master's degree and a teaching credential at San Francisco State University in 1961, with a master's thesis titled "Learning and Social Development at a Camp for Blind Children." She completed doctoral studies in education at the University of San Francisco in 1981.

== Career ==
Resnick was a concert pianist, and trained as a teacher, but as a blind woman was barred from employment in the New York City public schools. She taught music to blind students and gave recitals in New York, and was active on stage as an actress with the Lighthouse Players. She moved to California in the 1930s, after visiting San Francisco to compete in a national piano competition. She played piano in clubs and on radio during and after World War II. She gave school and community presentations combining musical performance and demonstrations with her guide dog, Ilsa.

After founding Recreation for the Blind and running a few summer camps at other locations in the late 1940s, Resnick bought land and, with Nina Brandt, became co-founder and co-director of the Enchanted Hills Camp in Napa County in 1950. "When children play in groups, it's natural to bridge that gap between the sighted world and the world of the blind," she explained in 1949. She left active directorship of the camp in 1961.

Resnick was founder and executive director of the California League of the Handicapped in San Francisco from 1961 to 1991. In 1965 she helped establish the Garden of Fragrance at Golden Gate Park, a multi-sensory park experience with blind signage. She started a library of audiotape materials for California prisoners with reading disabilities. Resnick's programs merged with the San Francisco Association for the Blind to become the San Francisco LightHouse for the Blind, and eventually the LightHouse for the Blind and Visually Impaired.

She wrote two autobiographies, Sun and Shadow: The Autobiography of a Woman who Cleared a Pathway to the Seeing World for the Blind (1975), and Dare to Dream: The Rose Resnick Story (1988).

== Honors and awards ==
Resnick won several scholarships and competitions as a young musician. Resnick's contributions were recognized by the National Council of Jewish Women, with the Hannah G. Solomon Award for community service. Hadassah presented Resnick with the Myrtle Wreath Award. In 1974 she was named Handicapped Professional Woman of the Year by Pilot Club International. In 1983, she received the Migel Award from the American Foundation for the Blind.

== Personal life ==
Resnick traveled for work and pleasure, including study in France as a young woman, and a consulting trip to Israel in the 1980s. She died in 2006, in San Francisco, aged 99 years. Enchanted Hills Camp continues to serve blind children, teens, and adults in the 21st century, though about half of the campground's structures were damaged by wildfires in 2017.
