= Lotta S. Rand =

American social worker

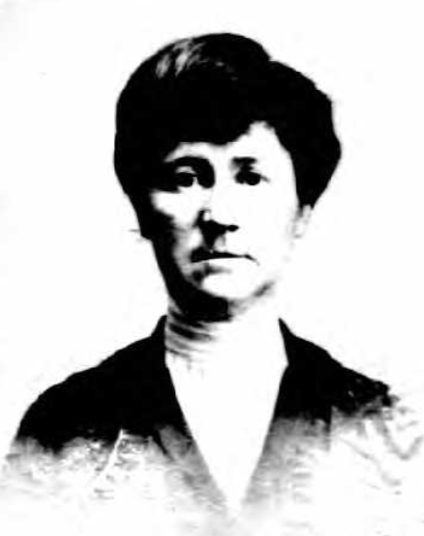
- Lotta S. Rand, from her 1918 passport application
- Born: August 26, 1868; Lynn, Massachusetts
- Died: December 3, 1956 (aged 88)
- Occupation(s): Social worker, charity executive

Lotta Stetson Rand (August 26, 1868 – December 3, 1956) was an American social worker and an executive at the American Foundation for the Blind.

== Early life and education ==
Rand was born in Lynn, Massachusetts, the daughter of John Howard Rand and Julia Dodd Spinney Rand.

== Career ==
Rand was a social worker in Lynn as a young woman. She became a deputy superintendent with the Massachusetts Commission for the Blind beginning in 1908. She was a delegate to the International Conference for the Blind, held in London in 1914. She spent three months with the American Red Cross in Halifax in 1918, assigned to report on conditions for blinded victims of the Halifax Explosion. Later in 1918 she went to France to work with the Red Cross in the care of American soldiers blinded in World War I.

In the early 1920s, Rand was executive secretary of the Harvard Graduate School of Education Course in Education of the Blind, an extension program. In the 1920s and 1930s she was associate director of the American Foundation for the Blind, based in New York. As AFB field representative, she toured in the United States speaking to community groups and raising funds. She often spoke on issues affecting people who became blind in adulthood.

Rand also made advance arrangements and accompanied some of Helen Keller's speaking engagements in the 1930s. Rand and Keller met as early as 1908, when Keller and Anne Sullivan Macy visited a handicraft shop in Manchester, Massachusetts, run by the Massachusetts Commission for the Blind, Rand was also on hand, as a commission superintendent.

== Publications ==
- Agencies for the blind in America: Directory of activities for the blind in the United States and Canada (1926, compiled by Rand)

== Personal life ==
Rand died in 1956, at the age of 88.
