= F. Hiner Dale =

Oklahoma judge

- Born: June 2, 1881
- Died: January 12, 1969 (aged 87)
- Education: Missouri State Normal School
- Occupations: attorney, state court trial judge
- Spouse: Elizabeth Eliza Neet
- Children: 6
- Parents: Reuben Judiah Dale (father); Nancy Jane Reasor (mother)

Fred Hiner Dale (June 2, 1881 – January 12, 1969) was a prominent state court trial judge in western Oklahoma between 1927 and 1950.

== Early life and education ==
A native of Elk Creek, Kentucky, Dale moved to Milo, Missouri at age 7. His parents were Nancy Jane Reasor and Reuben Judiah Dale. His father raised mules for a living. He had eight siblings.

In 1901, Dale received his teaching certificate from Missouri State Normal School (now known as Missouri State University), where he was the Orator of his class.

After teaching for a year, Dale matriculated at the University of Missouri in 1902. According to the Missouri Alumnus, he was a cadet in the Missouri National Guard from 1902 to 1905. He played for the 1902 Missouri Tigers football team, captained the all-sophomore team in 1903, and captained the all-senior team in 1905. During one summer, he was a door-to-door book salesman. The summer before his senior year, Dale and a college classmate, T.T. Simmons, doctored corns and warts using a recipe that they apparently purchased from a Native American doctor; Dale went by the name of J.S. Crow, since crows pick corn. Dale received his L.L.B. law degree from Missouri in 1906.

== Legal and professional work ==
In 1907, Dale settled in Guymon, in the panhandle of the newly created state of Oklahoma. According to the Guymon Daily Herald, the local weekly newspaper, Dale said that when came to Guymon, it was "a wild frontier town, with a livery stable, a saloon, a few mercantile stores, a dance hall, and from that day on, the Dale Law firm." For over a century, he, a son (Judge Don Dale), and/or a grandson (Douglas Dale) have been active at the Wright, Dale, and Jett law firm.

Dale served as Texas County Attorney between 1915 and 1921. He was nominated to the First District Court by Governor Henry S. Johnston in 1927 and was re-elected to the bench until his retirement in 1950. He also served for two years as a judge for the Oklahoma Court of Tax Review.

The panhandle region of western Oklahoma became the epicenter of the Dustbowl during the Great Depression and World War II. In his role as a judge for the district, Dale worked vigorously to help maintain local farms and ranches.

== Family ==
Dale and his wife, Elizabeth Eliza Neet, had six children: William, Vincent, Beth, Don, Daniel, and Neeta.

The four sons served contemporaneously during World War II. The youngest, Dan Dale, was a navigator on a B 24 Liberator bomber. He died at age 20 during the ill-fated Kassel Mission on September 27, 1944.

Ripley's Believe It Or Not recounted a 1938 case that involved Judge Dale and two of his children, who had also become lawyers. Dale's daughter, Beth Dale Hays, brought a lawsuit against Oklahoma City's Horn Seed Company. The seed company was represented by another of Dale's children, Vincent Dale. Judge Dale declined to recuse himself, indicating he loved his children equally. The son apparently mounted a successful defense.

A 4th child, Don Dale, served as a judge from 1969 to 1983 on the same district court where his father had served from 1927 to 1950.

== Other information ==
Dale kept many types of animals, including prairie dogs, who would apparently be welcomed into the Dale house when it was cold outside. As a burrowing rodent, prairie dogs have long been unpopular with ranchers and farmers, but, during the Depression, Dale created the “Great Western Prairie Dog Company” to send prairie dogs as pets for $5 each.

The largest hotel in Guymon was built in 1950-51 and was named the Hotel Dale. In 2016, the hotel was listed in the National Register of Historic Places by the National Park Service.

As of 2020, the City of Guymon continues to honor one person annually as the F. Hiner Dale Citizen of the Year.

Judge Dale was elected to the Oklahoma Hall of Fame in 1955.

Judge Dale published his autobiography, An Oklahoma Lawyer in 1961. He wrote Gentlemen of the Jury, an address in a murder case, in 1938. He also wrote two genealogies: A History of the Michael Reasor and Allied Families in 1941 and A History of the Pittenger Family in America in 1942.
