= LightHouse for the Blind and Visually Impaired =

Non-profit organisation in San Francisco

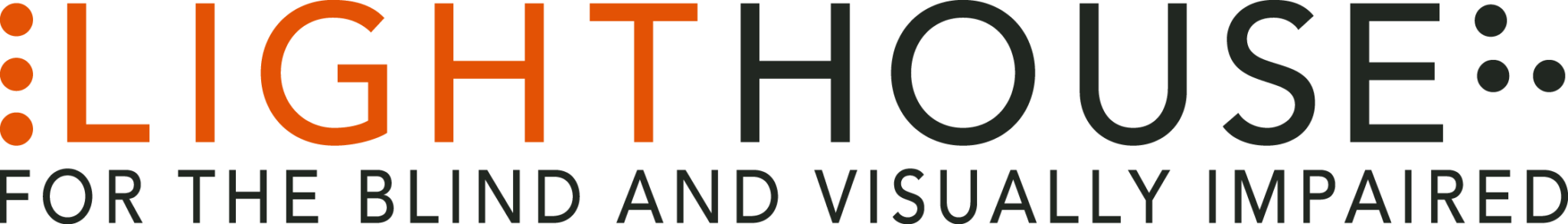
- Formation: 1902
- Founder: Josephine Rowan
- Type: Nonprofit
- Purpose: offers a variety of services for the blind and visually impaired
- Headquarters: San Francisco, CA
- Key people: Sharon Giovinazzo (CEO); Sharon Sacks (Board of Directors President)
- Affiliations: LightHouse Marin, LightHouse East Bay, LightHouse North Coast, Enchanted Hills Camp, LightHouse Industries Sirkin Center
- Website: lighthouse-sf.org

The LightHouse for the Blind and Visually Impaired is a San Francisco-based nonprofit organization, and is the oldest and largest of its kind in Northern California, United States.

== History ==
Founded in 1902 under the direction of Josephine Rowan as the Reading Room for the Blind in the San Francisco Public Library's basement, the LightHouse for the Blind and Visually Impaired has grown out of a series of nonprofit mergers throughout its century-long existence into an organization that provides a wide range of services for the visually challenged in the Bay Area.

In 1914, the organization became the San Francisco Association for the Blind and offered occupational classes in addition to employment opportunities to the blind in the production of brooms, baskets, and furniture. This manufacturing process was known as "Blindcraft" but has been discontinued since 1982.

The Association continued to expand and in 1924 moved to a new facility with the financial support of the Cowell family. The organization continued its manufacturing aspect and began providing braille classes, white cane instruction and counseling. In 1956 a Recreation/Education Center was added to the organization. In 1958 the San Francisco Association and Center merged with another non-profit known as Recreation for the Blind, to become the San Francisco LightHouse for the Blind. This marked the beginning of the LightHouse's involvement with the Enchanted Hills Camp as it belonged to Recreation for the Blind.

In 1993 the LightHouse had yet another merger, this time with the Rose Resnick Center, to become the Rose Resnick Lighthouse for the Blind and Visually Impaired and provide more services for those with blind and low vision. In 2004, the name Rose Resnick was omitted from the organization's title.

== Description ==
The organization offers a wide range of services for the visually challenged in order, according to its mission statement, to "promote the equality and self-reliance of people who are blind or visually impaired through rehabilitation training, employment placement, Enchanted Hills Camp and other relevant services." In 2014, the LightHouse received a $125 million bequest from Seattle construction insurance businessman Donald Sirkin, which is arguably the most sizable donation given to a blindness organization.

Today the LightHouse has multiple locations in Northern California, including, LightHouse Marin, LightHouse North Coast, LightHouse East Bay, Enchanted Hills Camp and LightHouse Industries Sirkin Center.

The LightHouse also maintains a blog and produces podcasts about the concerns and issues of the blind and visually impaired.

=== Headquarters and people ===
In 2016, the LightHouse moved into a $45M headquarters at 1155 Market Street in San Francisco. The LightHouse occupies the 9th-11th floors of the building, in a three-story office space designed by blind architect and former Board of Directors President Chris Downey together with Mark Cavagnero Associates.

As of 2023 Sharon Sacks is Board of Directors President.

== Holman Prize ==
Since 2017 the annual Holman Prize has been awarded "to support the emerging adventurousness and can-do spirit of blind and low vision people worldwide". Entrants must initially upload a 90-second video pitch to YouTube, and this is seen as part of the challenge. Selected applicants are then invited to make written submissions, and a shortlist are interviewed in person. Three winners are selected each year, and receive funding of up to $25,000 for an adventurous project which need not involve foreign travel but must "take them out of their comfort zone".

The prize is named for James Holman (1786-1857), a British adventurer and writer who was the first blind person to circumnavigate the Earth.

Winners have included:

Year	Laureates	Country
2022	Cassie Hames	Australia
2021	Aaron Cannon	USA
2021	Robert Malunda	Zimbabwe
2021	Maud Rowell	UK
2020	Tiffany Brar	India
2020	Birendra Raj Sharma Pokharel	Nepal
2020	Tyler Merren	USA
2019
2019	Alieu Jaiteh	Gambia
2019	Mona Minkara	USA
2019	Yuma Decaux	Australia
2018
2018	Red Szell	UK
2018	Stacy Cervenka	USA
2018	Conchita Hernandez	USA
2017
2017	Ahmet Ustunel	USA
2017	Ojok Simon	Uganda
2017	Penny Melville-Brown	UK
