= Boston line letter =

Tactile writing system, precursor to braille

Boston line letter was a tactile writing system created by Samuel Gridley Howe in 1835, a popular precursor to the now-standardized braille.

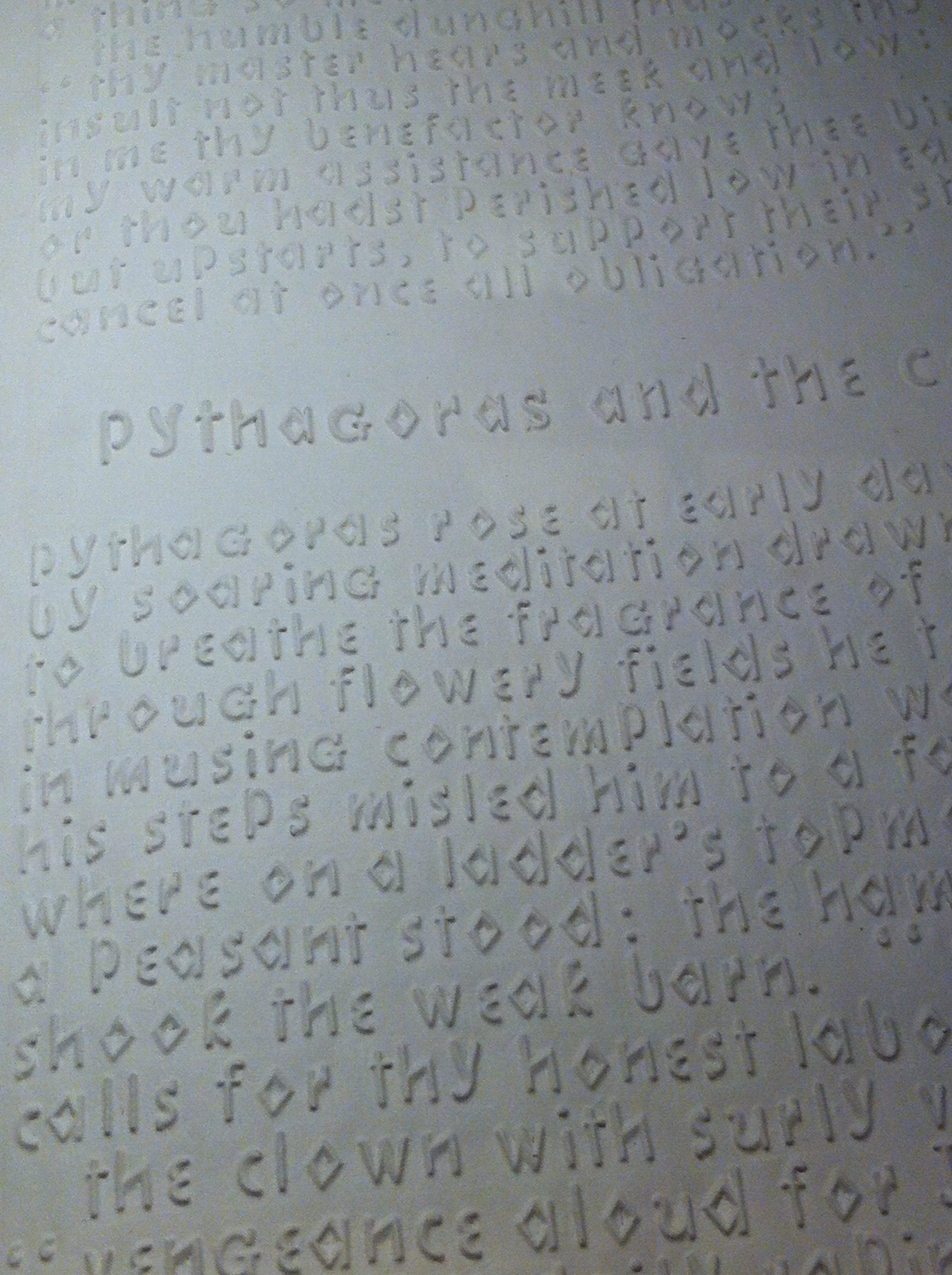
Example of Boston line letter at the Museum of the American Printing House for the Blind

== History ==
Samuel Gridley Howe, the first director of the New England Asylum for the Blind (now Perkins School for the Blind), studied tactile printing systems in Europe and developed his own system of raised type called Boston line letter. Howe's system was similar to raised letters designed by James Gall in Edinburgh, Scotland, in the 1820s. In 1835 Howe printed Acts of the Apostles, the first book produced in Boston line letter. The letterforms were an angular modification of Roman letters and had no capital letters. The first books embossed at the American Printing House for the Blind in 1866 were in Boston line letter.

By 1868, N.B. Kneass, Jr., a printer in Philadelphia, had adapted what became known as a "combined system" which used the lower case forms of Boston line letter and capital letters from a rival tactile system known as Philadelphia Line. Until replaced by dot systems, this hybrid form of raised letters was the predominant embossed type for blind people in the United States and the choice of most of the schools.
