= Mel Brown =

Mel Brown may refer to:

- Mel Brown (basketball) (1935–2019), Canadian basketball player
- Mel Brown (drummer) (born 1944), American jazz musician
- Mel Brown (guitarist) (1939–2009), blues guitarist
- Mel Brown (footballer) (1911–1995), Australian rules footballer
- Melanie Brown (born 1975), English singer, formerly of the Spice Girls

== See also ==
- Melvin Brown (disambiguation)
- Melissa Brown (disambiguation)
- Melville Brown (disambiguation)
