= Elk Creek, Kentucky =

Unincorporated community in Kentucky, United States

- Unincorporated community
- Location within Kentucky Location within the United States
- Coordinates: 38°07′01″N 85°22′20″W
- Country: United States
- State: Kentucky
- County: Spencer

Area
  - Total: 5.85 sq mi (15.15 km^{2})
  - Land: 5.79 sq mi (15.00 km^{2})
  - Water: 0.062 sq mi (0.16 km^{2})
- Elevation: 699 ft (213 m)

Population (2020)
  - Total: 1,986
  - Density: 343.0/sq mi (132.44/km^{2})
- Time zone: UTC-5 (Eastern (EST))
  - Summer (DST): UTC-4 (EDT)
- Area code: 502
- GNIS feature ID: 2628566

Elk Creek is an unincorporated community and census-designated place in Spencer County, Kentucky, United States. Its population was 1,986 as of the 2020 Census, up from 1,539 as of the 2010 census.

== Geography ==
According to the U.S. Census Bureau, the community has an area of 5.850 square miles (15.15 km^{2}); 5.789 square miles (14.99 km^{2}) of its area is land, and 0.061 square miles (0.16 km^{2}) is water. Elk Creek was, as late as 1955, the site of a church and cemetery, as well as a general store.

== Demographics ==
Historical population
Census	Pop.	Note	%±
2010	1,539		—
2020	1,986		29.0%
U.S. Decennial Census

=== 2020 census ===
As of the 2020 census, Elk Creek had a population of 1,986. The median age was 41.6 years. 25.0% of residents were under the age of 18 and 12.5% of residents were 65 years of age or older. For every 100 females there were 103.7 males, and for every 100 females age 18 and over there were 98.3 males age 18 and over.

0.0% of residents lived in urban areas, while 100.0% lived in rural areas.

There were 688 households in Elk Creek, of which 38.8% had children under the age of 18 living in them. Of all households, 78.3% were married-couple households, 6.0% were households with a male householder and no spouse or partner present, and 12.9% were households with a female householder and no spouse or partner present. About 9.7% of all households were made up of individuals and 5.1% had someone living alone who was 65 years of age or older.

There were 712 housing units, of which 3.4% were vacant. The homeowner vacancy rate was 2.6% and the rental vacancy rate was 0.0%.

Racial composition as of the 2020 census
Race	Number	Percent
White	1,776	89.4%
Black or African American	54	2.7%
American Indian and Alaska Native	4	0.2%
Asian	22	1.1%
Native Hawaiian and Other Pacific Islander	1	0.1%
Some other race	10	0.5%
Two or more races	119	6.0%
Hispanic or Latino (of any race)	50	2.5%

== History ==
Morrison Heady (1829–1915), poet and author, was born in Elk Creek.

F. Hiner Dale (1888–1969), attorney and judge, was born in Elk Creek.
