= Penny Melville-Brown =

Blind British veteran, baker, activist

Penny Melville-Brown is a British Royal Navy veteran, blind baker and winner of the Holman Prize. She served for 22 years in the Women's Royal Naval Service (WRNS) and Royal Navy, reaching the rank of commander. She was the first woman to hold the position of naval barrister. She was medically discharged from the Royal Navy in 1999 after her eyesight deteriorated and she created Disability Dynamics to help other people with disabilities to start a business. She was appointed OBE in the 2009 Birthday Honours "For services to Disabled and Disadvantaged People." In 2017, she was one of the three winners of the 2017 Holman Prize for Blind Ambition, an international award for blind people with ambition, named after 19th-century blind naval veteran James Holman. In 2018, she was awarded an honorary doctorate by Middlesex University. She has an online baking project called Baking Blind where she shows people how she cooks and encourages others to test their limits even if they have disabilities.

In late 2017 she was seriously injured in a car crash in France, and in a coma for five weeks.

In March 2022, she self-published her second cook-book: A cook's tour: Baking Blind goes global.

== Selected publications ==
- Melville-Brown, Penny (2022). A cook's tour: Baking Blind goes global. Penny Melville-Brown. ISBN 978-1739799007.
