= Melissa Brown (artist) =

American artist

Melissa Brown (born 1974) is an American artist who lives and works in New York. Brown is known for her paintings and her public artwork.

Her work is included in the collection of the Whitney Museum of American Art. She is a recipient of a Sharpe-Walentas Studio Program residency.

== Early life and education ==
Brown received a Bachelor of Fine Arts in Printmaking from the Rhode Island School of Design and a Master of Fine Arts from Yale University. She also attended the Skowhegan School of Painting and Sculpture.

== Works ==
Brown’s work transforms everyday imagery into a vehicle for reflection on perception, memory, and the experience of time.

Brown’s practice examines perception and temporality through a synthesis of printed photography, direct observation, and memory, using painting to explore how visual experience is shaped in an era when human life increasingly straddles analog and digital realities. Her work investigates the evolving nature of contemporary vision, particularly the ways in which traditional painterly representation is influenced by new media and the transition from analog images to digitally coded forms.

Critics have noted that her paintings function as meditations on perception itself, creating what has been described as an “impressive tour into states of looking and perception,” in which images appear to hover between immediacy and mediation.

Brown’s motifs frequently draw from everyday life, making seemingly banal subjects into scenes of quiet otherworldliness and imaginative possibility.

Working primarily in painting, while also engaging animation and public works, she creates compositions that reveal hidden complexity within ordinary environments. Her paintings often employ an intricate combination of techniques including stencil, airbrush, screen-printed digital photography, and impasto, which together generate both spatial and conceptual depth. Through these layered surfaces, portions of the image appear to drift in and out of focus, producing the sensation that multiple temporal registers are visible simultaneously.

=== Poker tournaments and interdisciplinary projects ===
Alongside her studio practice, Brown has organized and participated in poker tournaments in which artworks function as stakes.

Coverage in The Art Newspaper and Forbes has highlighted how these events challenge conventional art market structures by substituting artworks for monetary stakes. Her exhibition Rules of the Game at the Center for Book Arts further situates this work within an artistic engagement with games as frameworks for exploring authorship, ownership, and circulation.

== Exhibitions and reception ==
Brown has exhibited widely in the United States and internationally, with a sustained record of solo and group exhibitions. Her solo exhibition Window Shopping (2026) at Derek Eller Gallery in New York focused on storefront imagery and modes of visual consumption. Earlier exhibitions at the gallery include Two Pair (2023), Windows and Bars (2023), NYNY2020 (2020), and Between States (2018).

Other solo exhibitions include Flower Games (2025) at Cellar Contemporary in Trento, Rules of the Game (2024) at the Center for Book Arts in New York, West Coast Paintings (2022) at Anat Ebgi in Los Angeles, and Thrift Store Find (2022) at Andrew Rafacz Gallery in Chicago. Additional projects include Fountain (2019), a collaboration with Jamie Bull at the Lamar Dodd Galleries, and Going AWOL (2018) at the Biggins Gallery, Auburn University.
