= American Printing House for the Blind =

Non-profit organization in the U.S.

- Abbreviation: APH
- Founded: 1858; 168 years ago
- Type: 501(c)(3)
- Tax ID no.: 61-0444640
- Legal status: Nonprofit organization
- Headquarters: Louisville, Kentucky, U.S.
- Coordinates: 38.256220°N 85.714807°W
- Board Chair: Phoebe Wood
- Subsidiaries: Goodmaps Inc _{(C Corp)}
- Revenue: $22,611,443 (2020)
- Expenses: $28,814,266 (2020)
- Endowment: $6,237,601 _{(2020)}
- Employees: 373 (2019)
- Volunteers: 14 (2019)
- Website: www.aph.org

The American Printing House for the Blind (APH) is an American nonprofit corporation in Louisville, Kentucky, promoting independent living for people who are blind and visually impaired. For over 150 years APH has created unique products and services to support all aspects of daily life without sight.

== History ==
The first United States schools for blind children opened in the 1830s. There were very few books and educational materials for the students. Teachers made their own tactile teaching aids and acquired embossed books from Europe. The American Printing House for the Blind (APH) was established in 1858 in response to the growing need for books and educational aids for blind students.

Dempsey Sherrod, a blind man from Mississippi, promoted the idea of a central printing house for books for blind people. He raised funds for the enterprise, which he named the American Printing House for the Blind. In 1857, Sherrod obtained a charter in Mississippi to establish a publishing house to print books in raised letters, and because of its central location, named Louisville as the proposed location. In 1858, the General Assembly of Kentucky passed An Act To Establish The American Printing House For The Blind.

Two years later, in 1860, APH received its first operating funds from private citizens in Mississippi and Kentucky. A press was purchased and APH was set up in the basement of the Kentucky School for the Blind.

Legislatures in Mississippi, Louisiana, and Tennessee had appropriated funds for APH, and private donations had been collected in these states, but before the institution could begin its work of embossing books, the Civil War broke out. This wiped out any possibility of the southern states making good on their promises of funding. It was not until 1865 that a state allocation from Kentucky, along with donations from individuals in Ohio, Indiana, Kentucky, and Illinois, allowed APH to begin the work for which it was founded.

The first book produced by APH was Fables and Tales for Children. It was embossed in 1866 in a raised Roman letter type called Boston line letter. It would be many years before Braille was the standard reading system for blind people.

== Federal funding ==
Because printing books in raised letters could never be commercially successful, federal support was sought to assure a permanent printing fund. A bill was drawn up and presented to the 45th Congress. An Act to Promote the Education of the Blind became a law on March 3, 1879. The American Printing House for the Blind was designated as the official source of educational texts and aids for legally blind students throughout the country—a mandate that continues to the present.

Federal funding created new demands for embossed books and the Printing House soon outgrew its rooms at the Kentucky School for the Blind. APH Trustees purchased land adjacent to the school where, in 1883, a building was erected to house the growing operations of APH. The current APH facility is still located on the same site and occupies nearly a city block. APH employs over 300 people.

In the remaining years of the 19th century, the APH production of embossed books increased dramatically, growing from a 15-page publications catalog in 1894 to a 100-page listing ten years later. The first books had been produced in several different kinds of embossed codes and alphabets. Gradually, these systems were phased out in favor of braille. APH printed its first braille books—several readers and children's books—in 1893.

Improvements were continually sought for a better stereograph, a faster press—anything that would lower the cost of embossed book production. Catalog offerings were basic braille slates, writing guides, maps, spelling frames, etc.

In the twentieth century APH continued its efforts to provide accessible materials to help blind people become independent. Publication of the braille edition of Reader's Digest in 1928 provided blind readers with the first popular magazine available in braille.

Currently, school districts can purchase products with federal quota funds managed by Ex-Officio Trustees. These funds were established through the 1879 Act to Promote the Education of the Blind, and Congress votes annually on how much money to set aside for this purpose.

== Talking Books ==
In 1936, the APH recording studio and record production department were established and production of Talking Books began. The first recorded weekly magazine, the Talking Book edition of Newsweek, was introduced in 1959 and the first recorded encyclopedia, the Talking World Book, in 1981. Flexible records were first produced in 1970 and cassette tapes in 1973. Today, APH's Talking Book Studio records about 1,000 talking books for the National Library Service for the Blind and Print Disabled ever year alongside many other audio description projects.

== Products and services ==
In addition to braille, large type (1948), and recorded books, APH produced educational aids. To facilitate development of these products, an educational research department was established in 1953. Notable products were the New Hall Braille Writer (1940), the Lavender Braille Writer (1962) and the Cranmer Abacus (1963). In 1960, APH completed the largest braille project ever undertaken, the 145-volume braille edition of the World Book Encyclopedia.

Today, APH offers high-tech products, low-tech products, and services for children and adults who are blind or low vision and Teachers of the Visually Impaired. They continue to focus on creating researched and field-tested educational tools that support expanded core curriculum areas and standards for K-12 students who are blind or have low vision, producing around 10 new products for this demographic every year.

In 2010, APH started their technology product research department to help meet the growing need for better high-tech products for people who are blind, including apps, GPS/navigation tools, and braille translation software. APH also produces textbooks for Teachers of the Visually Impaired and other professionals who work with visually impaired students through APH Press. APH's most notable high-tech product, the Monarch multiline refreshable braille and tactile graphics display, was created in collaboration with HumanWare. This device is a 10-line by 32-cell display that is the first of its kind and includes a word processor, a graphic calculator, a braille editor, access to hundreds of free tactile graphics, a web browser, a book reader, an email app, and a chess app. APH offers free resources for educators, parents, and adult users of the Monarch and continually releases new updates and apps for the device.

APH's outreach services department, formerly field services, was created in 1961 when an amendment to the Act to Promote the Education of the Blind was made to include an appropriation to meet the costs of advisory and consultant services in connection with the administration of the Act. Outreach services offers regional support and trainings, holds educational events for students, and coordinates APH's annual meeting of Ex-Officio Trustees.

The APH ConnectCenter originated at the American Foundation for the Blind and moved to APH in 2018. Through VisionAware, CareerConnect, and FamilyConnect, they provide free support and resources for adults who are losing or have recently lost their vision, jobseekers who are blind, and families who have a child who is blind.

In 2022, Polly, APH's braille learning device that teaches students basic braille skills through quick games, was recognized in TIME's 200 Best Inventions of 2022 list. In 2024, APH was included in Fast Company's list of most innovative companies in the education category. Fast Company also named the Monarch as a finalist in their Innovation by Design Awards in the accessible design category.

== Campus ==
To house the growing production, the building has been expanded many times. A new administration building, built in front of the 1883 façade, opened in 1955. In 1980, an addition to the manufacturing area brought the building to its present size (282,000 sq. ft.). A 28,000 square feet addition will be completed in 2026, housing a new museum, The Dot Experience.

Efforts to improve braille production resulted in the first computerized braille translation in 1964. IBM, the company that led in developing the program, donated a $2 million 709 computer. By 1987, all but a fraction of braille production was completely computerized.

A computerized database for accessible textbooks was introduced in 1988 and was expanded to include materials in all accessible media. In 1997, the database was named Louis and made available on the Internet.

== Museums ==
Museum of the American Printing House for the Blind
- Established: 1994
- Location: Louisville, Kentucky
- Coordinates: 38°15′27.38″N 85°42′49.55″W
- Website: www.aph.org

The Museum of the American Printing House for the Blind opened in 1994 and was located on the APH campus in Louisville. The museum told the story of the international history of the education of people who are blind, and how the APH has contributed to that history. Exhibits focused on tactile systems, writing devices, braille production, orientation and mobility, educational aids and early schools for the blind. It was located on the second floor of the company's original 1883 factory building. The Museum of the American Printing House for the Blind closed in 2024.

The museum was designed to be accessible for people who are blind or low vision, with labels in Braille, audio, and large print formats. It also featured learning experiences such as using braillewriters and mobility feature walking canes.

=== Layout and exhibits of the Museum of the American Printing House for the Blind ===
Visitors entered the museum through the 1883 Gallery which contained the exhibit "History in the Making: APH from Past to Present." The exhibit focuseed both on the specific history of APH and the various products it has produced including raised-print books, audiobooks, and stereotype machines. This exhibit was praised for its use of photographs and artifacts but criticized for the minimal attention given to those who worked in the APH factory which the museum now inhabits.

The main Callahan Gallery focused on development of reading systems and schools for blind people over time, across the United States as well as specifically in Kentucky. "The Way We Worked" focused on production machines used in the APH Gallery. There was also room for traveling exhibits.

=== The Dot Experience ===
The Dot Experience is APH's re-imagined museum set to open in 2026. The museum is privately funded and will be five times larger than the original museum. The Dot Experience's development has been focused on making all exhibits accessible to everyone, regardless of ability. The museum will house the American Foundation for the Blind Helen Keller Archive and many of the historical items related to braille, blindness education, and the history of APH will also be on display.

== See also ==
- List of attractions and events in the Louisville metropolitan area
- List of museums in the Louisville metropolitan area
