= American Foundation for the Blind =

Non-profit organization in the US

- Founded: 1921; 105 years ago New York City, U.S.
- Type: Non-profit organization
- Location: Arlington, Virginia, U.S.
- Key people: M.C. Migel; Robert B. Irwin; M. Robert Barnett; Carl R. Augusto
- Revenue: $9.6 million (2024)
- Website: www.afb.org

The American Foundation for the Blind (AFB) is an American non-profit organization, specifically a 501(c)(3), for people with vision loss. AFB's objectives include conducting research to advance change, promoting knowledge and understanding, and shaping policies and practices.

AFB is especially known for its development of the Talking Book in the 1930s, and for having studios for recording these books in various audio technologies. The M.C. Migel Memorial Library, in existence since the 1920s, hosted one of the leading print collections of non-medical research regarding blindness and visual impairment. Throughout its history, AFB has put out a scholarly journal, at first called Outlook for the Blind, then The New Outlook for the Blind, and subsequently, the Journal of Visual Impairment & Blindness. Over the years, AFB has engaged in partnerships with the American Printing House for the Blind that have included transferring some of its programs to them, such as the Migel Library in 2009.

Eric Bridges, formerly the Executive Director of the American Council of the Blind, has been AFB's president and CEO since April 12, 2023. For most of its history, AFB was based in New York City. Since 2017, AFB's main headquarters have been in Arlington, Virginia.

== History ==
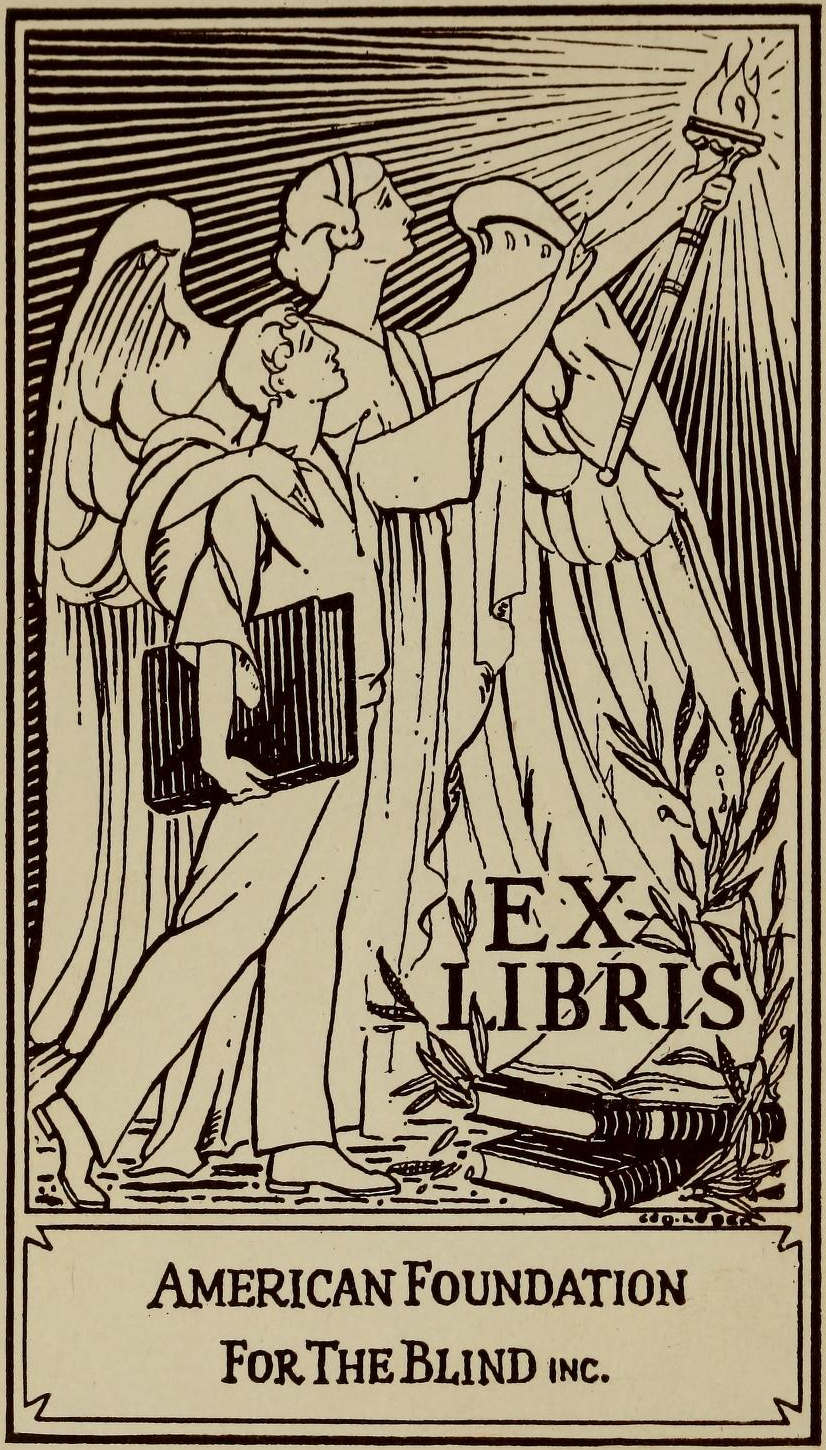
AFB bookplate, 1921

AFB, with the support and leadership of M.C. Migel, a philanthropist who was moved to help the large number of veterans blinded in World War I, was formed in 1921 to provide both a national clearing house for information about vision loss and a forum for discussion for blindness service professionals. Its founding, made official at the convention of the American Association of Workers for the Blind in Vinton, Iowa, was also intended to spur research and represent the needs of people with vision loss in the US government. It filed as a tax-exempt organization in 1922. Its role as a national clearinghouse for information began in 1923.

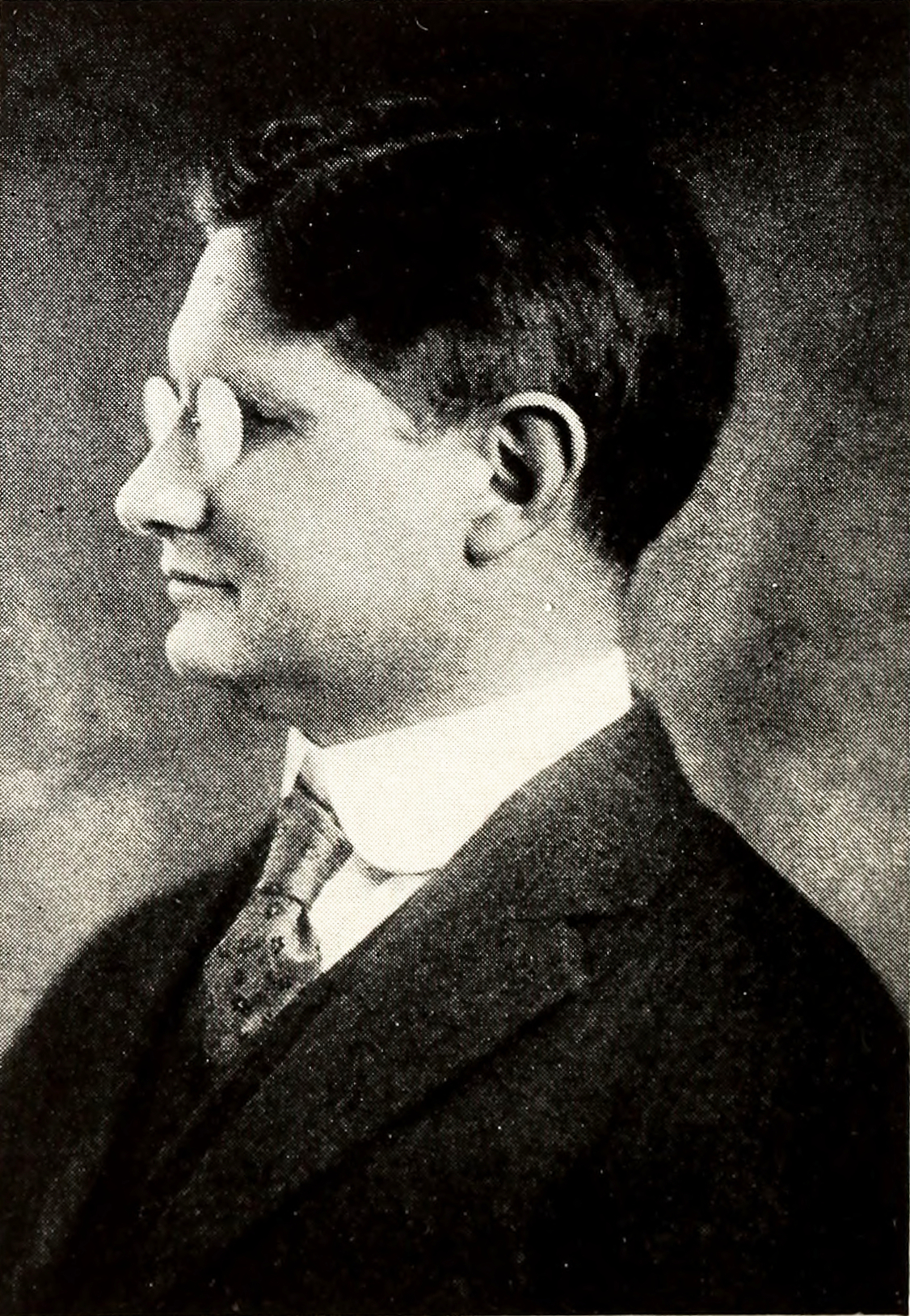
Robert B. Irwin, Director of the Bureau of Research of the American Foundation for the Blind, early 1920s; later he was the executive director of AFB

AFB's early accomplishments included taking the lead to standardize English Braille code and establishing the first professional publications program for teachers and administrators of programs for people with vision loss. In 1926, AFB's Directory of Services for Blind and Visually Impaired Persons was first published, compiled by social worker Lotta S. Rand. The directory continued to be used for decades afterward as resource for both professionals and for the blind and their families to locate services in their geographical areas.

In its early years, the foundation had its headquarters on East 46th Street in Manhattan. AFB hosted the World Conference for the Blind in New York City in 1931.

In 1932, AFB engineers developed the Talking Book and Talking Book Machine and set up studios for recording these books, marking the advent of the modern audiobook. AFB played a major role in persuading the federal government to include talking books in the National Library System for blind people operated by the Library of Congress. The development by AFB of the Talking Book made a large-scale difference in how services could be extended to blind patrons. The foundation engaged in fundraising campaigns to support thousands of talking book machines being distributed around the country. In 1936, AFB set up arrangements for two additional organizations to produce Talking Books, the American Printing House for the Blind (APH) and the British National Institute for the Blind. APH made extensive changes to its production facilities for this purpose. Within the United States, the Library of Congress gave lists of titles needing recording and AFB and APH split the lists between them.

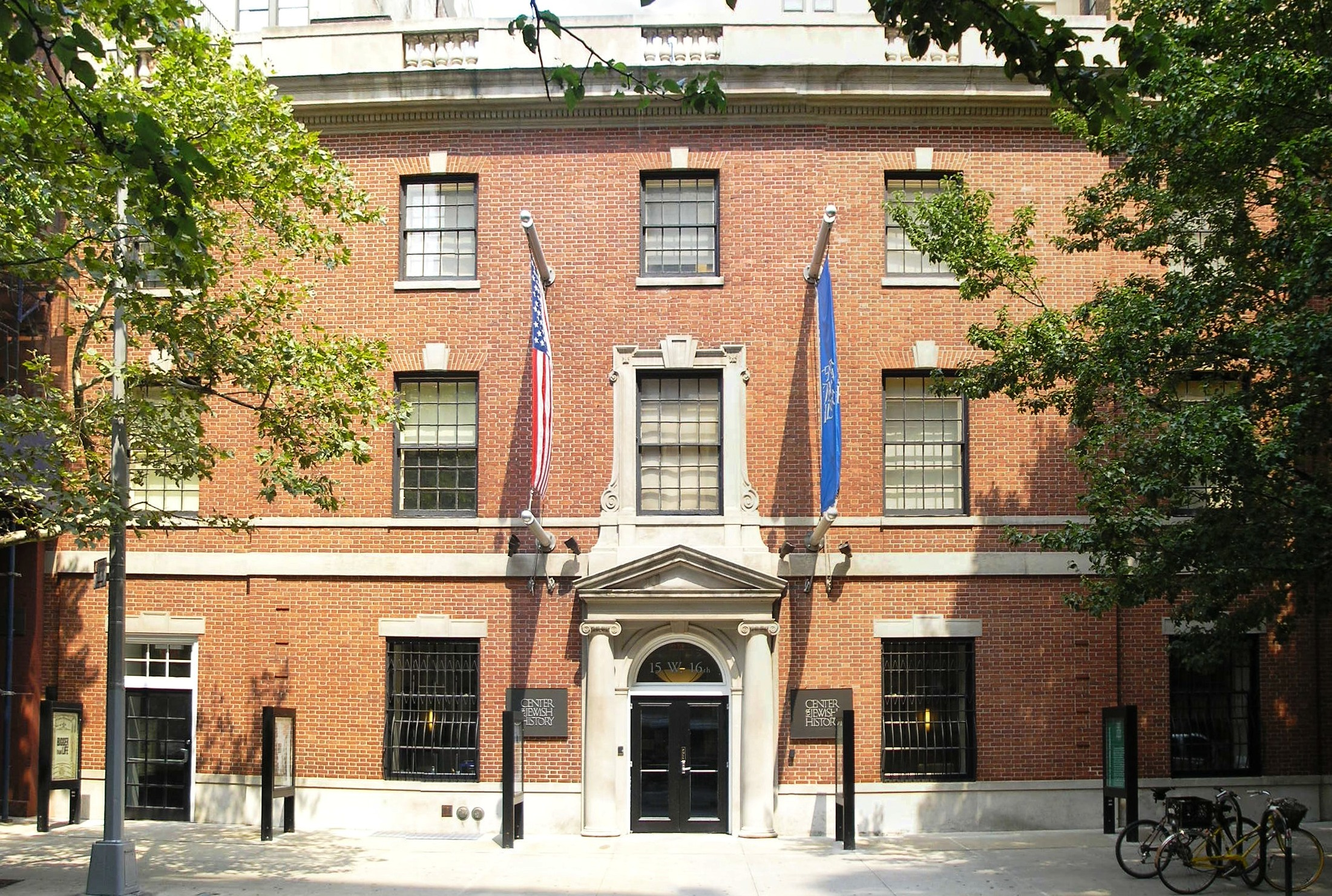
From the 1930s through the 1990s, the American Foundation for the Blind had its headquarters at this building, 15 West 16th Street, in Manhattan in New York City

In 1934, the foundation built a new headquarters at 15 West 16th Street in Manhattan, between Fifth Avenue and Sixth Avenue, in what would become known as the Ladies' Mile Historic District. It was a three story, Georgian Colonial style structure. Over time, a grouping of four buildings, surrounding a courtyard, became occupied by the American Foundation for the Blind. They consisted of two Georgian Colonial buildings on West 16th Street as well as another building and a taller loft on West 17th Street.

The information and public education department at AFB conducted tours of the facility and the recording studios for visiting professionals and student groups. This was a practice that has also been done at the similar facilities of APH. Among AFB's activities was sponsoring various conferences, seminars, and workshops, such as the National Seminar on Services to Young Children with Visual Impairment (1970), the First National Conference on Aging and Blindness (1976), or a regional conference for the employment of visually handicapped persons in hotels and motels (1969), and then publishing the proceedings of these forums.

AFB's advocacy efforts have led to the passage of significant legislation for people with vision loss. AFB was instrumental in creating and passing the Americans with Disabilities Act of 1990 (ADA) and more recently worked on the renewal of the Individuals with Disabilities Education Act (IDEA) to ensure that it contained provisions to meet the specific needs of children with vision loss.

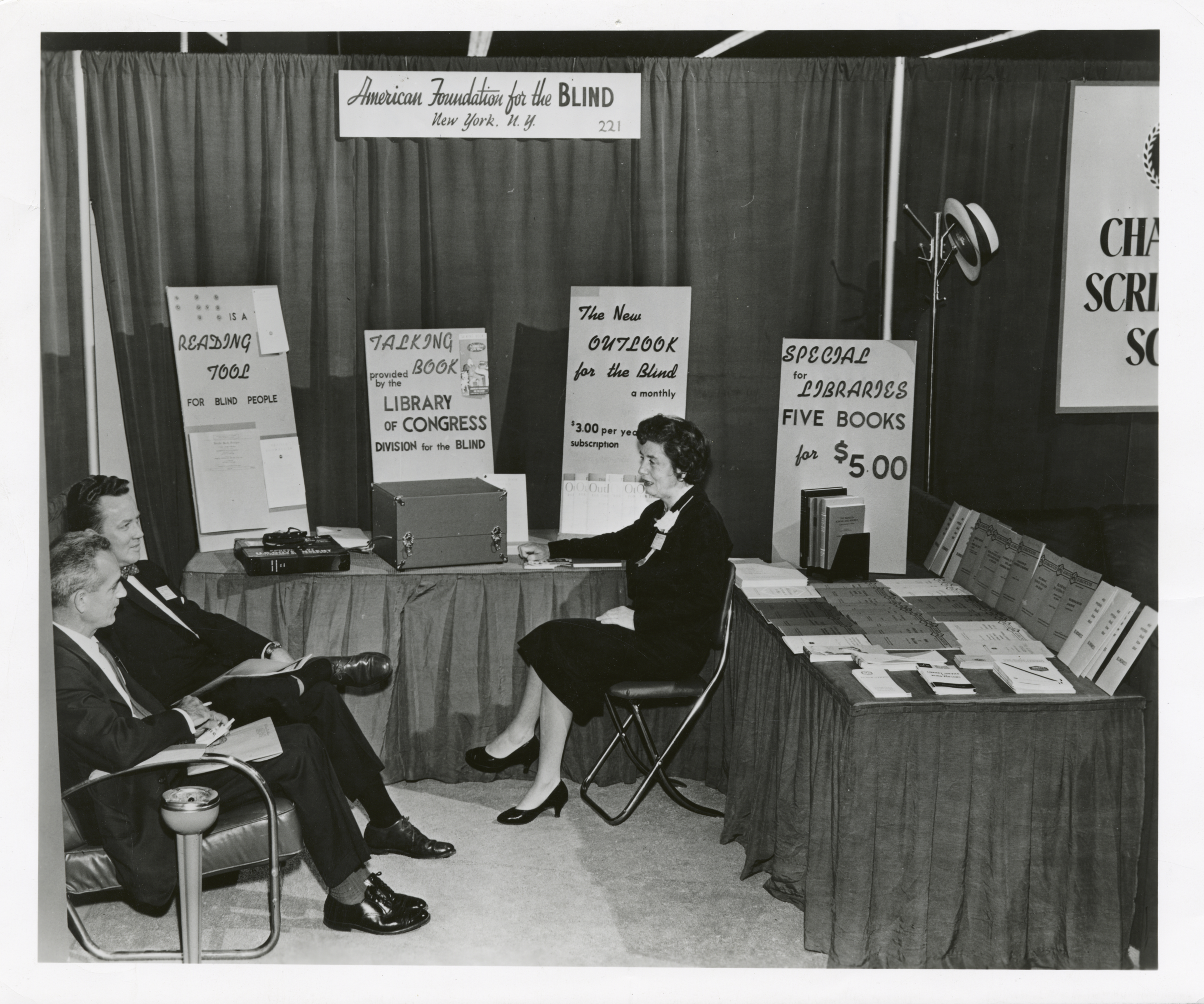
AFB exhibit booth at an American Libraries Association event in San Francisco, 1958

By the 1980s, the cassette tape was the most common format for audio books, and they could be borrowed for no charge from the Library of Congress. With eight recording studios featuring actors and actresses reading text, the American Foundation for the Blind was the largest producer of such cassette tapes for the Library of Congress and the format had become more popular than Braille for use by the vision impaired.

For many years, AFB designed, manufactured and sold products that were made specifically for people with vision loss, such as braille writers, magnifiers, and audio blood pressure monitors. AFB also works with technology manufacturers at the design stage to develop products that can be used by everyone, sighted or visually impaired. Especially since the advent of digital technology, AFB believes that working to establish universal design practices among technology producers is the most promising and cost-effective option for making all products accessible in the long term.

AFB is the organization to which Helen Keller devoted her life. She worked for AFB for more than 40 years and was instrumental in the foundation of the Talking Books Program, among many others. She remained with AFB until her death, in 1968. Under the terms of her will, she selected AFB as the repository of her papers and memorabilia, which AFB maintains in the Helen Keller Archive.

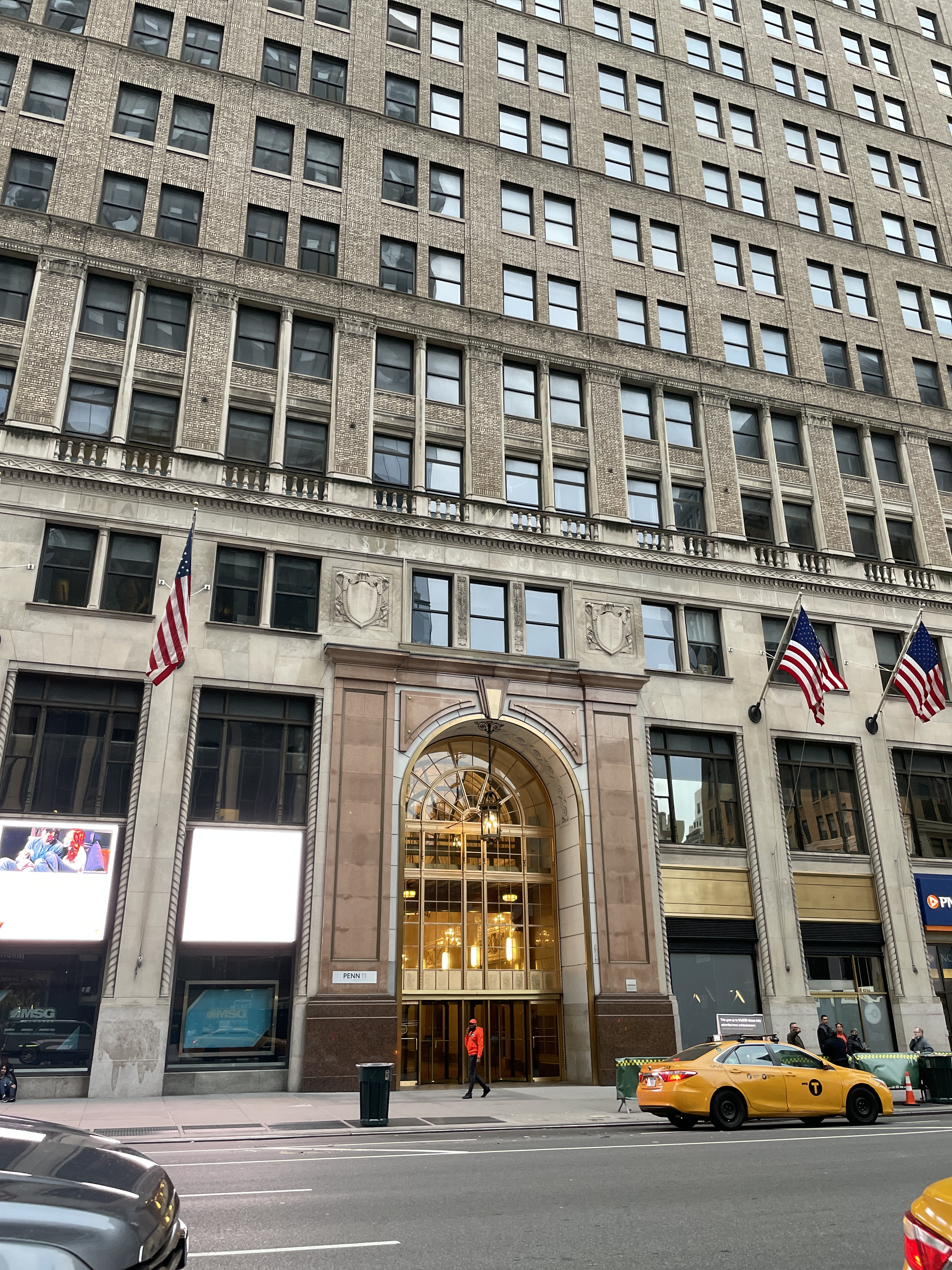
AFB had its headquarters at 11 Penn Plaza starting in 1997, and stayed in Penn Plaza until 2017

During the mid-1990s, the foundation decided to leave its West 16th Street location, but wanted to stay in New York City because of the talent pool there for the production and recording of the talking books it made and because of New York's status as a world city. As a result, it leased space in Penn Plaza in midtown Manhattan moving to 11 Penn Plaza in 1997. (AFB sold its 16th and 17th Street buildings to the YIVO Institute for Jewish Research, and the complex there became part of the combined Center for Jewish History.)

To cut costs during the 2008 financial crisis, AFB implemented staffing reductions and moved to smaller offices at 2 Penn Plaza.

Louis Braille was the Frenchman who invented the raised dot code that bears his name. On January 4, 2009, the 200th anniversary of his birth, AFB created an online gallery that includes pictures of him and digitized books and articles.

In 2017, the foundation moved its headquarters from New York to the Washington metropolitan area, specifically Arlington, Virginia. AFB had had a government relations office in Washington since the late 1940s.

== M.C. Migel Memorial Library ==
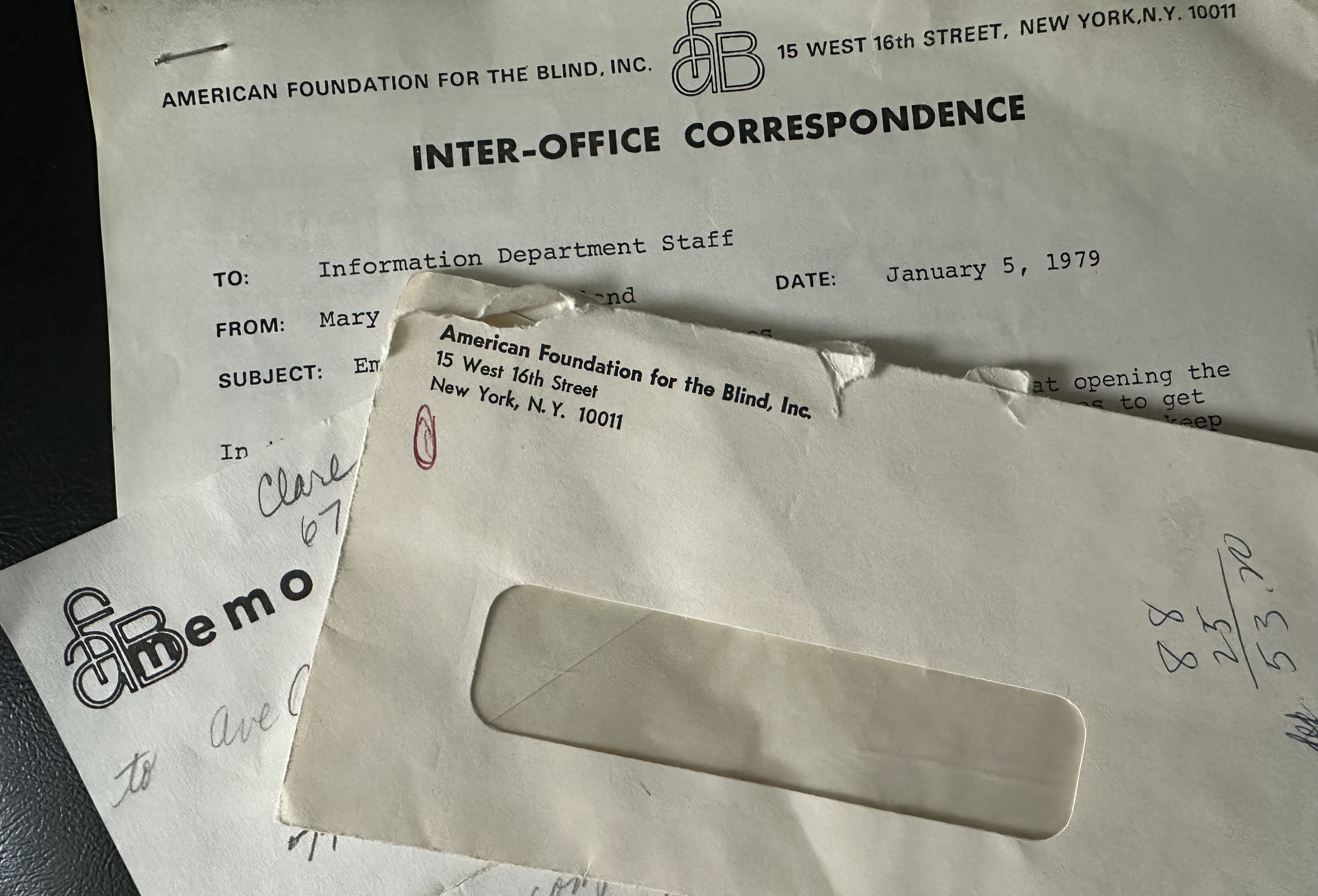
Some AFB documents from the late 1970s, showing the logo in use at the time

The origins of a research library at the American Foundation for the Blind date to 1926, and by 1928 there were 800 volumes. The building of the new AFB quarters on 16th Street in 1934 contained space for a library, which by then contained some 6,000 volumes.

This is a special library. In particular, it is a print collection on blindness and visual impairment and was not intended as a repository of Braille works. In 1963, the library was renovated and named after M.C. Migel, the philanthropist who had helped form the foundation; at that point it had 25,000 volumes.

The library has one of the leading collections of non-medical research regarding blindness and visual impairment. The volumes in the library cover topics such as rehabilitation, orientation and mobility, education, employment, and aging. There are also fictional titles and children's books related to blindness and visual impairment as well as a periodicals collection going back to the 1920s. The library also has materials on the life of Helen Keller. The M. C. Migel Memorial Library would come to be considered as one of the two most renowned American libraries in the field of blindness, with the other being the Samuel P. Hayes Research Library at the Perkins School for the Blind in Watertown, Massachusetts.

By the early 1970s, the Migel Library had 30,000 volumes and several librarians on staff to manage it. By later in the 1970s it had some 35,000 volumes. New acquisitions by the library were regularly listed and described in a column in the New Outlook for the Blind and Journal of Visual Impairment & Blindness journals.

During the mid-1970s, some staff from the library acted in a consulting role on a grant project to Temple University for a monograph and subsequent serials which filled a 25-year gap in the bibliographic listing of nonmedical literature related to visual impairment.

The library's physical space was renovated during the early 1980s and a considerable amount of computer technology was introduced at that time. With 37,000 volumes in the collection, the name was expanded to the M.C. Migel Memorial Library & Information Center. By the end of the decades of the 2000s, the library had some 40,000 volumes.

In 2009 it was announced that the operation of the Migel Library would be transferred from AFB to the American Printing House for the Blind, and physically from New York to Louisville, Kentucky. With its name changed slightly to the M.C. Migel Memorial Collection, it remains there. (The M.C. Migel Memorial Rare Book Collection was not part of this transfer, but instead was kept at AFB until its sale to the Library of Congress in 2021.)

== Journal of Visual Impairment & Blindness and its predecessors ==
In 1923, the foundation took over publication of the journal Outlook for the Blind, which had been in operation since 1907. In these early years the periodical had operated on a minimal budget, often reprinting articles from other sources. The journal absorbed another publication in 1942, The Teachers Forum for Instructors of Blind Children, and became known as Outlook for the Blind and The Teachers Forum. In 1951, the title of this journal changed to The New Outlook for the Blind.

It then was renamed to the Journal of Visual Impairment & Blindness in 1977. At this point it adopted a peer review process and fully assumed the role of a professional journal, one with international scope. It was available in print, braille, and recorded formats. It continues to be published under that name, in association with the American Foundation for the Blind. Access to braille readers is available via Braille-Ready Format (BRF) files.

== Blind Leaders Development Program ==
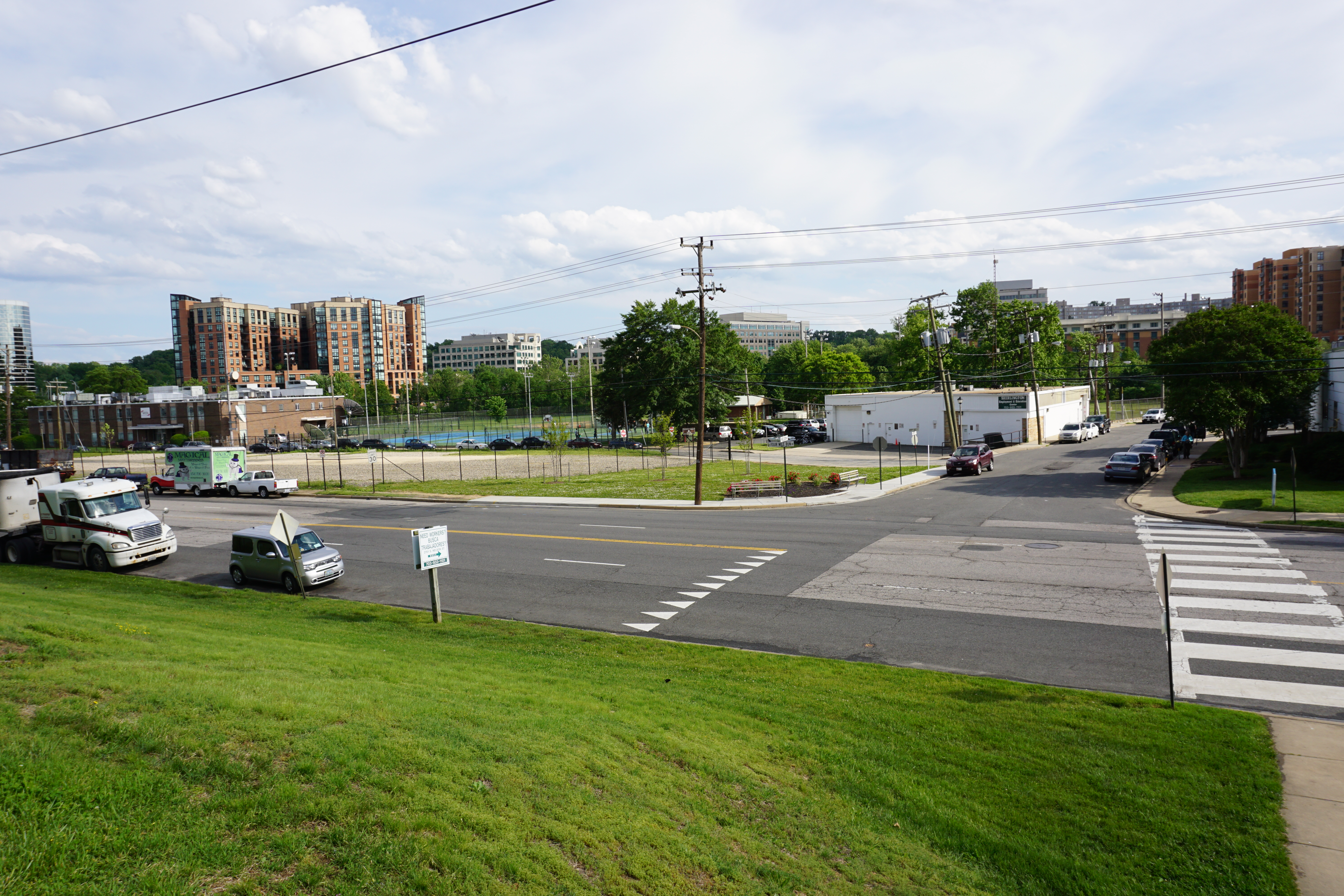
As of 2017, AFB headquarters are located in Shirlington Tower in Arlington, Virginia, near the distant center of this scene

AFB launched the Blind Leaders Development Program in 2019 with the purpose of increasing upward mobility and creating meaningful leadership experiences for individuals who are blind or low vision, who are already employed and in the beginning stages of their careers. Every year, AFB selects a class of blind or visually impaired individuals: 50% emerging leaders as fellows and 50% established leaders to act as their mentors.

== Partnership with the American Printing House for the Blind ==
The American Foundation for the Blind has a long history of cooperative arrangements with the American Printing House for the Blind (APH), which was founded in the mid-19th century and is based in Louisville, Kentucky. In the 1930s, they collaborated on technical issues regarding the creation of Talking Books, and in the 1940s during the shortages experienced in the United States home front during World War II, they teamed up to find supplies of Vinylite and other necessary raw materials.

Cooperative arrangements continued with the transfer of the M. C. Migel Memorial Library from AFB to APH in 2009.

In 2018, AFB partnered with the American Printing House for the Blind (APH) to transition several AFB programs to continue under APH’s stewardship, including AFB Press, VisionAware, FamilyConnect, CareerConnect, and BrailleBug. With these programs under APH’s oversight, AFB said it would take its own work "to a new level by investing in policy and programs focused on creating stronger social systems, and ultimately a more inclusive, accessible society for people with vision loss."

== Helen Keller Archive ==
In 2018, AFB launched the Helen Keller Archive, the first fully accessible digital archive collection, comprising more than 160,000 artifacts, dedicated to the life and works of Helen Keller. It is the largest repository of historical content about Helen Keller, whose iconic name is known in every corner of the globe for her groundbreaking work as an author, political activist, and humanitarian who played a critical role in changing public perceptions about people with disabilities.

== VisionAware ==
In 2012, AFB added VisionAware to its family of sites in partnership with the Reader's Digest Partners for Sight Foundation. The site folded in content from AFB's Senior Site, with new information and resources for adults of all ages with vision loss.

VisionAware's stated goal is to help adults and their family members to cope with age-related eye diseases, a growing public health problem in the United States. According to research on vision problems in Americans over 40, rates of vision loss from diseases like age-related macular degeneration, glaucoma and diabetic retinopathy are expected to double by 2030, as America's 78 million baby boomers reach retirement age.

In 2018, VisionAware was transferred to the American Printing House for the Blind as part of the AFB-APH partnership.

== FamilyConnect ==
In spring 2008, AFB and the National Association for Parents of Children with Visual Impairments (NAPVI) launched FamilyConnect, an online community for caregivers of children with visual impairments. NAPVI is an affiliate of Lighthouse Guild. In 2018, VisionAware was transitioned to the American Printing House for the Blind as part of the AFB-APH partnership.

== Chief executives ==
The highest-ranking official at the American Foundation for the Blind has been variously referred to as the executive director, president, or chief executive officer.

1. Robert B. Irwin, executive director, 1929–1949
2. M. Robert Barnett, executive director, 1949–1974
3. Loyal Eugene Apple, executive director, 1974–1980
4. William F. Gallagher, executive director and later president, 1980–1990
5. Carl R. Augusto, president and CEO, 1991–2016
6. Kirk Adams, president and CEO, 2016–2022
7. Eric Bridges, president and CEO, 2023–present
