= James Holman =

British adventurer and author (1786–1857)

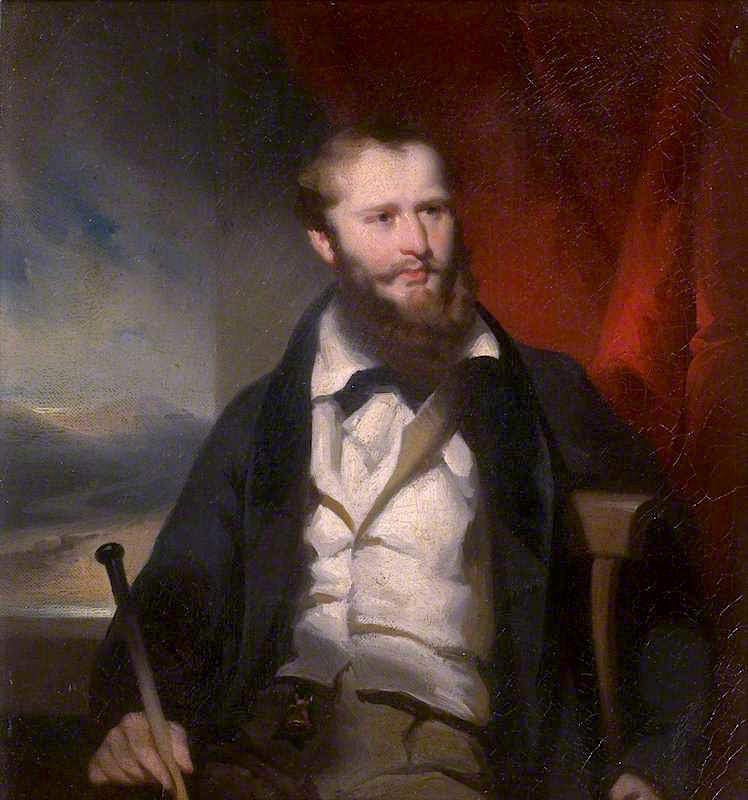
- James Holman, in an 1830 Royal Society portrait by George Chinnery painted in Canton (modern-day Guangzhou)
- Born: 15 October 1786
- Died: 29 July 1857 (aged 70)

James Holman FRS (15 October 1786 – 29 July 1857), known as the "Blind Traveller," was a British adventurer, author and social observer, best known for his writings on his extensive travels. Completely blind and experiencing pain and limited mobility, he undertook a series of solo journeys that were unprecedented both in their extent of geography and method of "human echolocation". In 1866, the journalist William Jerdan wrote that "From Marco Polo to Mungo Park, no three of the most famous travellers, grouped together, would exceed the extent and variety of countries traversed by our blind countryman." In 1832, Holman became the first blind person to circumnavigate the globe. He continued travelling, and by October 1846 had visited every inhabited continent.

== Life and travels ==
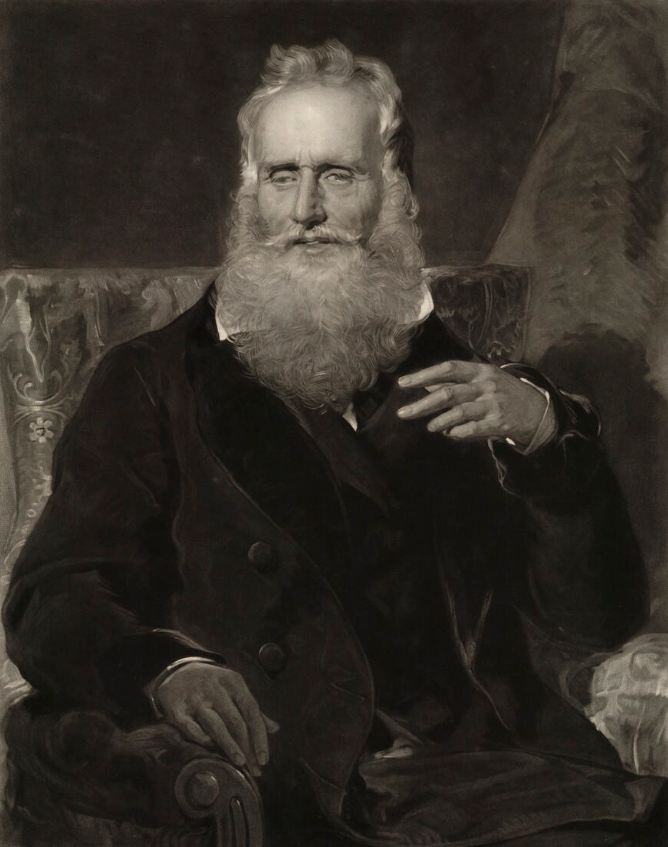
Holman in old age

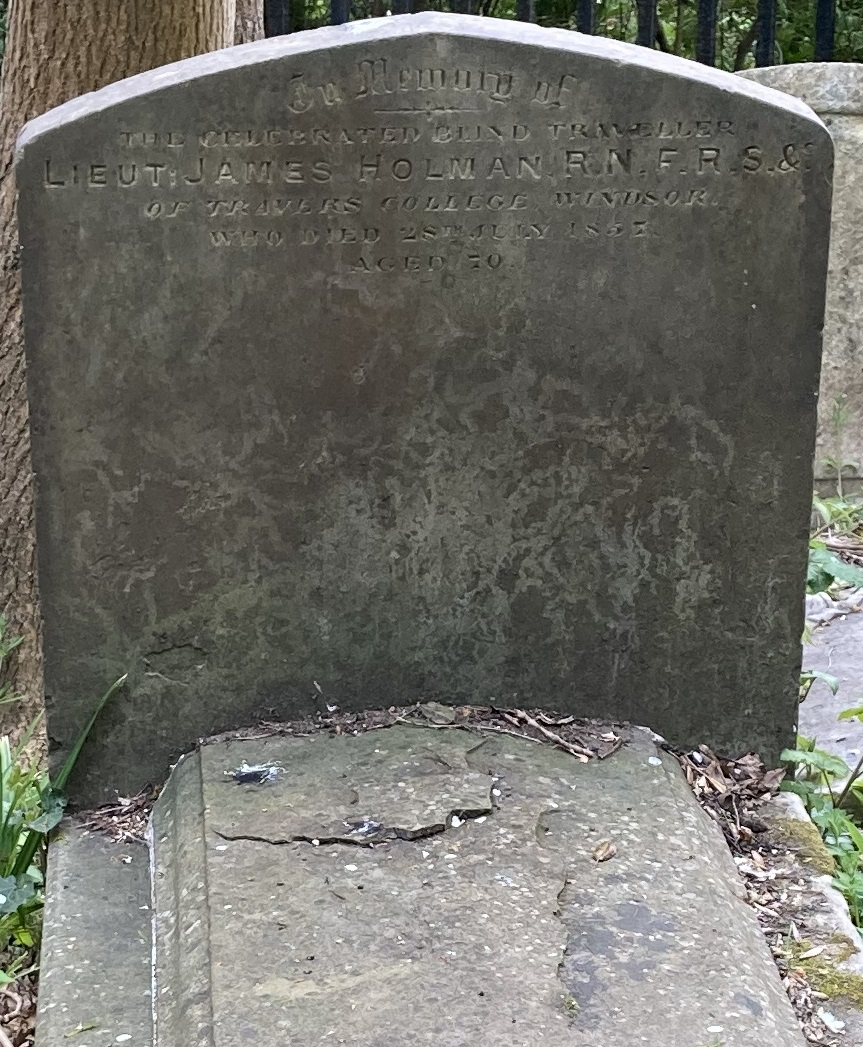
Grave of James Holman in Highgate Cemetery

Holman was born in Exeter, the son of an apothecary. He entered the British Royal Navy in 1798 as first-class volunteer, and was appointed lieutenant in April 1807. In 1810, while on the Guerriere off the coast of the Americas, he was invalided by an illness that first affected his joints, then finally his vision. At the age of 25, he was rendered totally and permanently blind.

In recognition of the fact that his condition was duty-related, he was in 1812 appointed to the Naval Knights of Windsor, with a lifetime grant of care in Windsor Castle. This position demanded he attend church service twice daily as his only duty in return for room and board, but the quietness of such a life harmonized so poorly with his active habits and keen interests, physically making him ill, that he requested multiple leaves of absence on health grounds, first to study medicine and literature at the University of Edinburgh, then to go abroad on a Grand Tour from 1819 to 1821 when he journeyed through France, Italy, Switzerland, the parts of Germany bordering on the Rhine, Belgium and the Netherlands. On his return he published The Narrative of a Journey through France, etc. (London, 1822).

He again set out in 1822 with the incredible design of making the circuit of the world from west to east, something which at the time was almost unheard of by a lone traveller, blind or not - but he travelled through Russia as far east as the Mongolian frontier of Irkutsk. There he was suspected by the Czar of being a spy who might publicize the extensive activities of the Russian American Company should he travel further east, and was conducted back forcibly to the frontiers of Poland. He returned home by Austria, Saxony, Prussia and Hanover, when he then published Travels through Russia, Siberia, etc. (London, 1825).

Shortly afterwards he again set out to accomplish by a somewhat different method the design which had been frustrated by the Russian authorities; and an account of his remarkable achievement was published in four volumes in 1834–1835, under the title of A Voyage Round the World, including Travels in Africa, Asia, Australasia, America, etc., from 1827 to 1832.

His last journeys were through Spain, Portugal, Moldavia, Montenegro, Syria and Turkey. Within a week of finishing an autobiography, Holman's Narratives of His Travels, he died in London on 29 July 1857 and was buried in Highgate Cemetery. This last work was never published, and likely has not survived.

== Recognition ==
Holman was elected a Fellow of the Royal Society (UK), and of the Linnaean Society (UK). Charles Darwin, in The Voyage of the Beagle, cited Holman's writings as a source on the flora of the Indian Ocean. On Fernando Po Island, now part of Equatorial Guinea, the British Government named the Holman River in his honour, commemorating his contributions to fighting the slave trade in the region during the 1820s.

=== Holman Prize ===
Since 2017 the San Francisco-based LightHouse for the Blind and Visually Impaired has awarded an annual Holman Prize, named in Holman's honour. Three blind people are each given up to $25,000 to support them in an adventurous project.

== Gallery ==
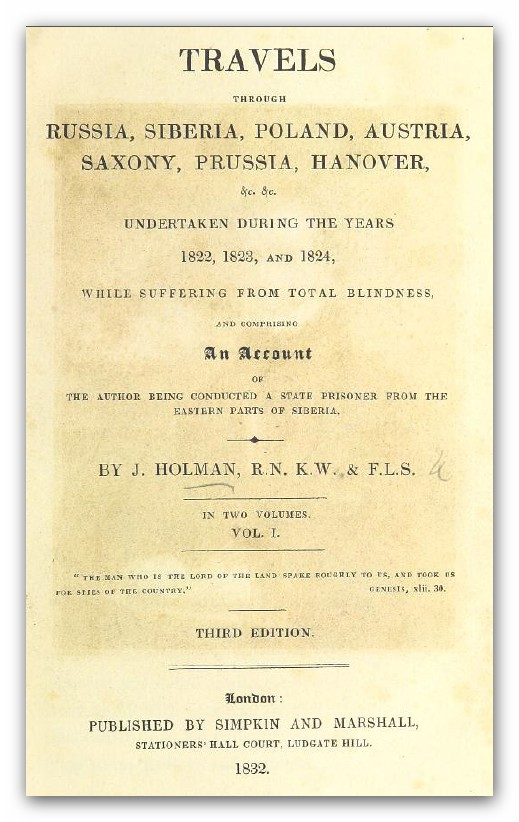
Travels through Russia, Siberia, Poland, Austria, Saxony, Prussia, Hanover, etc. (1832)

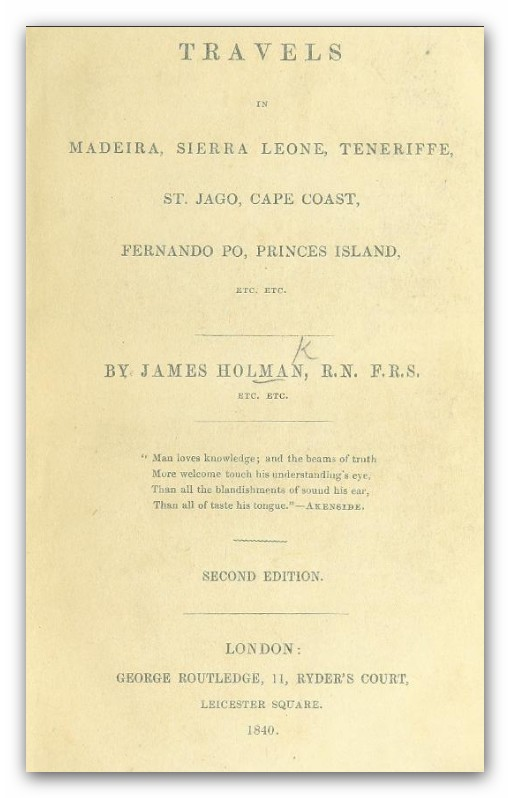
Travels in Madeira, Sierra Leone, Teneriffe, St. Jago, Cape Coast, ... Princes Island, etc. (1840)

== See also ==
- O'Byrne, William Richard (1849). "Holman, James" . A Naval Biographical Dictionary. Vol. 9.4. London: John Murray. pp. 530–531.
- The Wool Road (New South Wales)
- Roberts, Jason. A Sense of the World: How a Blind Man Became History's Greatest Traveler, ISBN 0007161263
