= OutSpoken =

One of the first commercially available screen readers for a graphical user interface

OutSpoken (styled outSPOKEN) was one of the first commercially available screen readers for a graphical user interface (GUI). Its notable innovations were the use of an off-screen model and the mouse pointer as a review cursor. The original Macintosh version was written by Wes Boyd and Bruce Berkhalter at Berkeley Systems. OutSpoken was first released for the Macintosh in 1989, and was the only screen reader ever available for the Macintosh prior to VoiceOver. OutSpoken for Microsoft Windows was released in 1994 for Windows 3.1, and was widely recognized as one of the first truly effective screen readers for Windows. OutSpoken for Windows was developed primarily by Ben Drees and Peter Korn, with user interface design by Marc Sutton and Joshua Miele.

Berkeley Systems sold OutSpoken and all of its other accessibility assets to Alva Access Group of the Netherlands in 1996. In September, 2005, Optelec acquired the assets of ALVA BV., the parent company of ALVA Access Group.
