= Mona Minkara =

American scientist and advocate for the blind

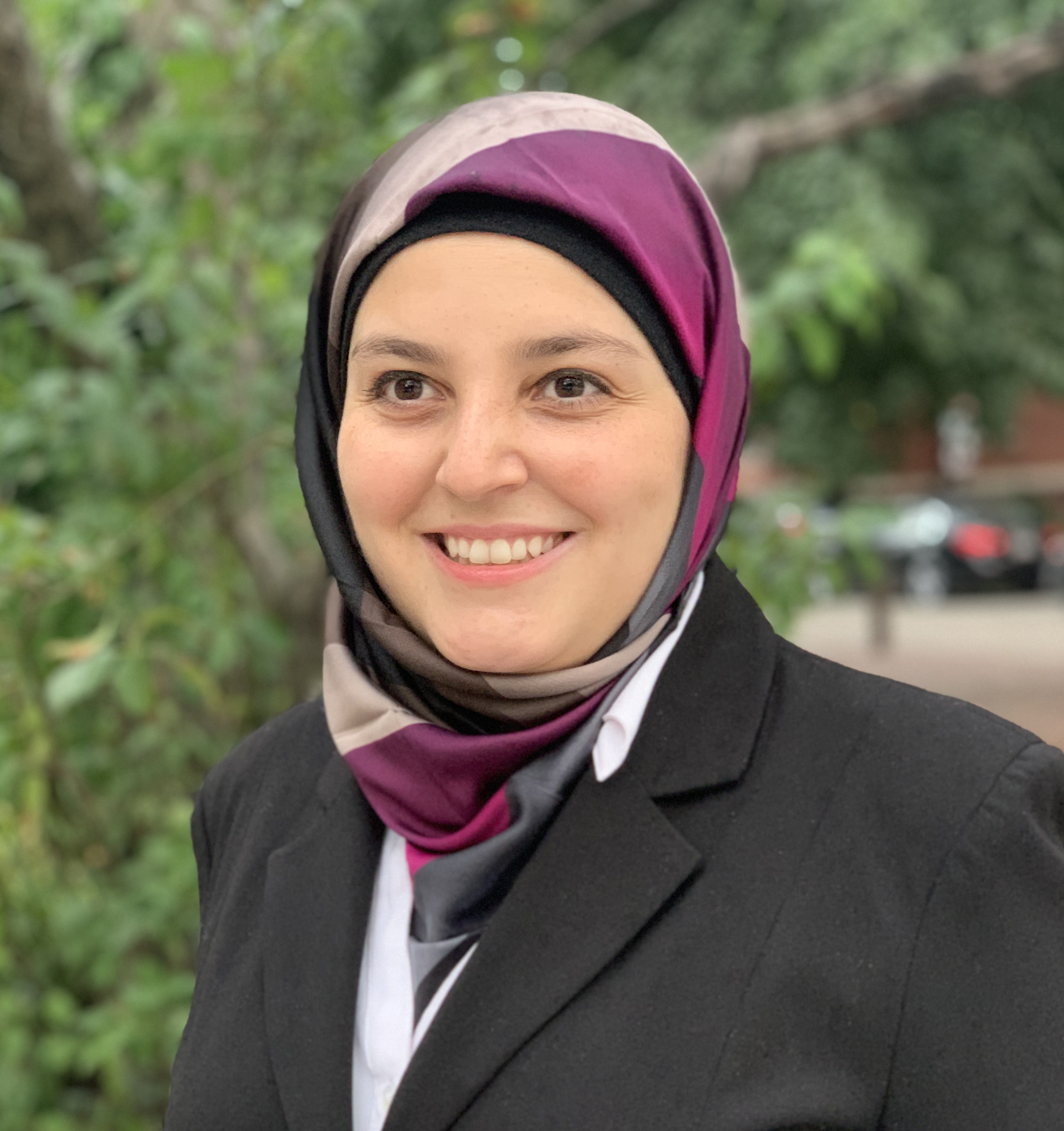
- Born: Mona Samer Minkara; Maryland, U.S.
- Education: Wellesley College (BA); University of Florida (PhD)
- Known for: Computational modeling of pulmonary surfactant Multisensory accessibility in science Planes, Trains, and Canes (YouTube travel series)
- Scientific career
- Fields: Bioengineering, Computational Biophysics
- Workplaces: Northeastern University
- Doctoral advisors: Kenneth M. Merz Jr., Erik Deumens
- Website: www.monaminkara.com

Mona Minkara is an American-Lebanese blind bioengineer and computational biophysicist whose research focuses on molecular modeling of the pulmonary surfactant system and innate immune recognition at the lung air–liquid interface. She is an Assistant Professor of Bioengineering at Northeastern University and an affiliated faculty member in the Department of Chemistry and Chemical Biology, where she directs the Computational Modeling for Biointerface Engineering (COMBINE) Lab.

Minkara’s research uses molecular dynamics and multiscale computational modeling to investigate how pulmonary surfactant proteins interact with lipids and glycans to support respiration and early immune defense against airborne pathogens. Her work has examined collectins, including surfactant proteins A (SP-A) and D (SP-D), as well as surfactant proteins B and C (SP-B and SP-C), which contribute to lung stability and breathing mechanics.

In addition to her research contributions, Minkara has been recognized for her work on accessibility in scientific research and education. She is blind and has been involved in the development of multisensory approaches for representing molecular and nanoscale data, including tactile and nonvisual scientific tools. She is the founding director of the Academy of Blind Scientists and the creator of Planes, Trains, and Canes, a public media project examining travel accessibility.

== Biography ==
Minkara was born in Maryland to parents who immigrated to the United States from Tripoli, Lebanon. Raised in a bilingual household speaking Arabic and English, she grew up in the greater Boston area and frequently visited Lebanon during her childhood, shaping her multicultural identity.

Diagnosed in early childhood with macular degeneration and cone-rod dystrophy, Minkara gradually lost her vision. Despite early discouragement about the feasibility of pursuing science as a blind person, she earned her Bachelor of Arts in Chemistry and Middle Eastern Studies from Wellesley College in 2009. Her senior thesis focused on the design of HIV reverse transcriptase inhibitors.

She received her Ph.D. in Chemistry from the University of Florida in 2015, conducting research at the Quantum Theory Project, under the mentorship of Professors Kenneth M. Merz Jr. and Erik Deumens. Her dissertation contributed novel insights into the dynamics of urease inhibition in Helicobacter pylori.

She received her Ph.D. in Chemistry from the University of Florida in 2015, where she conducted doctoral research at the Quantum Theory Project under the supervision of Kenneth M. Merz Jr. and Erik Deumens. Her dissertation focused on quantum mechanical and molecular dynamics approaches to enzyme inhibition, including studies of Helicobacter pylori urease.

Following her doctoral training, Minkara completed postdoctoral research at the University of Minnesota’s Chemical Theory Center under the mentorship of J. Ilja Siepmann. Her postdoctoral work involved molecular simulation of surfactant interfaces and interfacial thermodynamics. During this period, she collaborated with Procter & Gamble on computational studies of surfactant formulations and was supported by a Ford Foundation Fellowship administered through the National Academies of Sciences, Engineering, and Medicine.

In 2019, Minkara joined Northeastern University as a tenure-track Assistant Professor in the Department of Bioengineering and later became affiliated with the Department of Chemistry and Chemical Biology. She directs the COMBINE Lab, where she mentors students in computational biophysics and molecular modeling.

== Research ==
Minkara’s research focuses on the computational biophysics of the pulmonary surfactant system, which operates at the air–liquid interface of the lung. Her work examines how molecular interactions at this interface contribute to both respiratory mechanics and innate immune recognition.

A central area of her research involves surfactant collectins, particularly SP-A and SP-D, which are calcium-dependent pattern-recognition receptors that bind pathogen-associated glycans. Although these proteins share conserved carbohydrate-recognition domains, they exhibit distinct binding preferences and immune functions. Minkara’s research uses molecular dynamics simulations, free-energy calculations, and multiscale modeling to investigate how factors such as calcium coordination, hydration structure, and binding-pose stability influence collection–glycan recognition under physiologically relevant conditions.

Her group has developed computational workflows for studying protein–glycan interactions that integrate binding-pose analysis, solvation benchmarking, and thermodynamic modeling. These approaches have been applied to systems relevant to respiratory pathogens, including influenza viruses and Pseudomonas aeruginosa.

In addition to collection–glycan recognition, Minkara’s research has addressed the broader biophysics of pulmonary surfactant proteins. Her work includes computational studies of surfactant proteins B and C, which regulate interfacial stability and play a role in maintaining lung function during breathing.

== Accessibility and Inclusive Scientific Practice ==
Minkara is blind and has contributed to efforts aimed at increasing accessibility in scientific research and education. Drawing on her experience as a computational scientist, she has collaborated with researchers and educators to develop multisensory approaches for representing molecular and nanoscale data, including tactile graphics and nonvisual modeling tools.

She is the founder of the Blind Scientist Toolkit, a collection of resources designed to support accessible engagement with scientific content for blind researchers and students. These efforts focus on adapting existing scientific workflows and representations to improve accessibility without altering scientific standards.

Minkara is also the founding director of the Academy of Blind Scientists, an international professional network of blind scientists with doctoral training that supports peer mentorship, professional development, and community building across scientific disciplines.

== Advocacy ==
Minkara is recognized for her leadership in promoting accessibility in science. She co-founded ALLIED (Allies for Leading, Learning, Inclusion, and Education of Disabilities) at Northeastern, a cross-campus initiative advancing accessibility through community. Since 2020, she has also led a weekly mentorship program for blind and disabled students in STEM, supporting individuals across six continents.

She has served on the American Chemical Society’s (ACS) Committee on Chemists with Disabilities (CWD) and regularly consults with educators, publishers, and institutions on inclusive scientific practices. Her motto, "Vision is more than sight," captures her belief that scientific insight comes in many forms—eyesight is just one of many tools. We are all capable of vision.

=== Planes, Trains, and Canes ===
Minkara is the creator and host of the YouTube travel series Planes, Trains, and Canes, where she navigates global cities alone as a blind traveler using only public transportation. The series showcases how cities around the world accommodate people with disabilities. It has been screened at international festivals and used as an educational resource in accessibility training programs.

== Awards and recognition ==
Minkara has received recognition for her research, teaching, and contributions to science and accessibility. In 2026, she was named a Sloan Research Fellow in Chemistry.

Her research program has been supported by competitive federal funding, including a National Institutes of Health Maximizing Investigators’ Research Award (MIRA) and a National Science Foundation CAREER Award.

She received the Martin W. Essigmann Outstanding Teaching Award from Northeastern University in 2022 and the Holman Prize from LightHouse for the Blind in 2019. Earlier in her career, she was supported by a Ford Foundation Fellowship and a Howard Hughes Medical Institute undergraduate research award.

Her research and public scholarship have been featured in outlets including Nature, Science Advances, and NPR’s All Things Considered.

== Professional service and public engagement ==
Minkara has participated in professional service activities related to disability and accessibility in science and engineering. She has served on committees within scientific societies, including the American Chemical Society’s Committee on Chemists with Disabilities.

She has contributed to national and international discussions on disability in STEM through invited lectures, advisory roles, and consultations with academic institutions, publishers, and research organizations.

In addition, Minkara is the creator and host of Planes, Trains, and Canes, a travel series documenting her navigation of public transportation systems as a blind traveler. The series examines accessibility features of urban transit infrastructure in cities around the world. Episodes have been screened at events including the VinFen Film Festival and have been incorporated into discussions on urban design, mobility, and transportation accessibility.

== Select publications ==
- Li, Deng; Minkara, Mona S. (November 2025). "Decoding SP-D and glycan binding mechanisms using a novel computational workflow". Biophysical Journal. 124 (22): 3923–3931. doi:10.1016/j.bpj.2025.04.007. PMC 12418041. PMID 40211540.
- Li, Deng; Minkara, Mona S. (23 December 2024). "Comparative Assessment of Water Models in Protein–Glycan Interaction: Insights from Alchemical Free Energy Calculations and Molecular Dynamics Simulations". Journal of Chemical Information and Modeling. 64 (24): 9459–9473. doi:10.1021/acs.jcim.4c01361. PMC 11684738. PMID 39378441.
- Li, Deng; Minkara, Mona S. (2022). "Elucidating the enhanced binding affinity of a double mutant SP-D with trimannose on the influenza A virus using molecular dynamics". Computational and Structural Biotechnology Journal. 20: 4984–5000. doi:10.1016/j.csbj.2022.08.045. PMC 9452405. PMID 36097510.
- Locke, Tyler; Ferrante, Amanda; Li, Deng; Weaver, Michael N.; Minkara, Mona S. (January 2026). "Conformational changes of surfactant protein B due to the alveolar air/liquid interface using molecular dynamics". Journal of Molecular Modeling. 32 (1) 4. doi:10.1007/s00894-025-06585-4. PMC 12678512. PMID 41343084.
- Koone, Jordan C.; Dashnaw, Chad M.; Alonzo, Emily A.; Iglesias, Miguel A.; Patero, Kelly-Shaye; Lopez, Juan J.; Zhang, Ao Yun; Zechmann, Bernd; Cook, Noah E.; Minkara, Mona S.; Supalo, Cary A.; Wedler, Hoby B.; Guberman-Pfeffer, Matthew J.; Shaw, Bryan F. (19 August 2022). "Data for all: Tactile graphics that light up with picture-perfect resolution". Science Advances. 8 (33) eabq2640. doi:10.1126/sciadv.abq2640. PMC 9385137.
- Greenvall, Benjamin R.; Tiano, Amanda L.; Chandani, Anjali; Minkara, Mona S. (July 2021). "The Influence of a Blind Professor in a Bioengineering Course". Biomedical Engineering Education. 1 (2): 245–258. doi:10.1007/s43683-021-00052-1. PMC 8169403. PMID 34095899.
