= Melvin Jerome Brown =

American chef (born 1967)

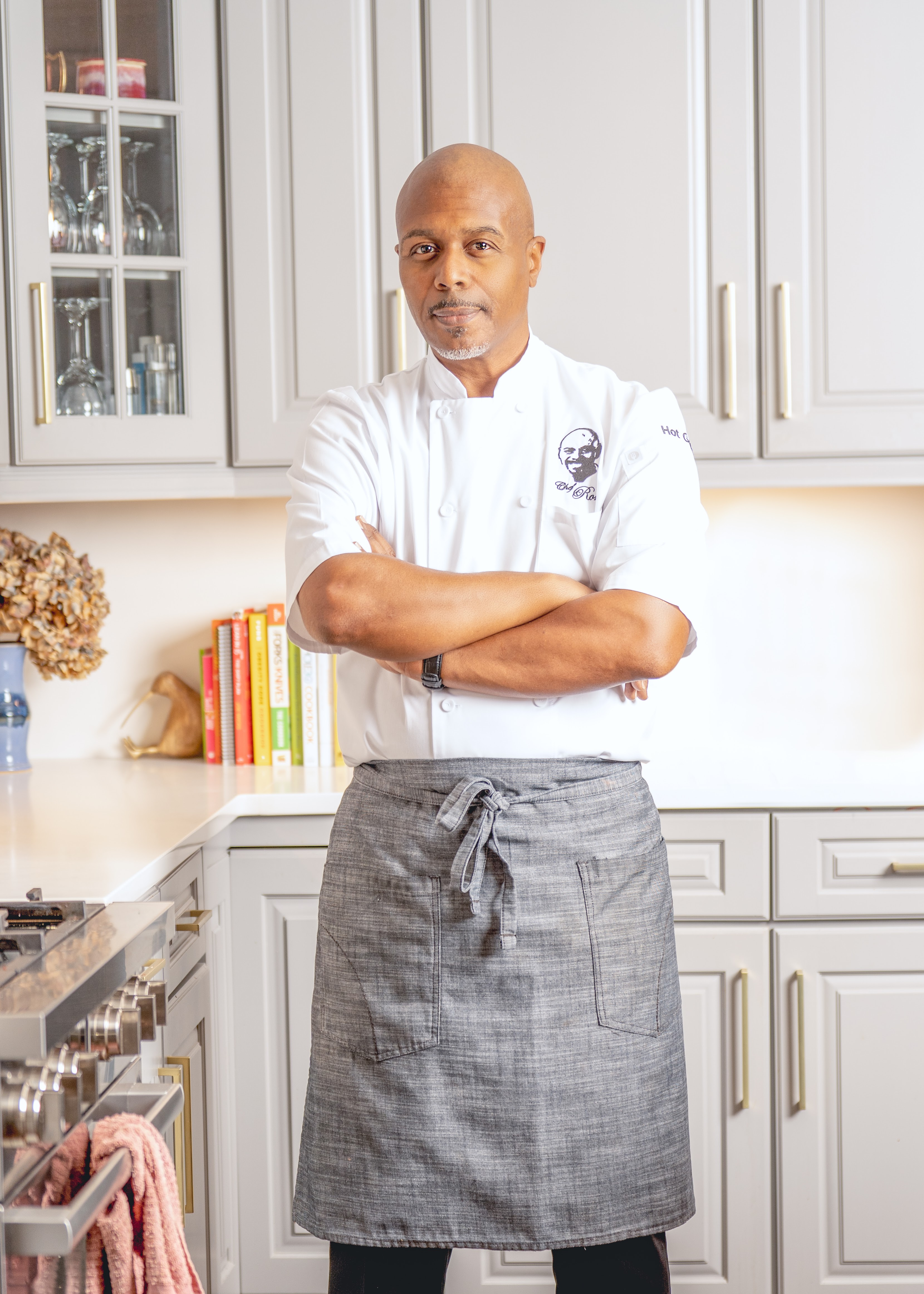
- Chef Jerome Brown
- Born: July 6, 1967 (age 58); Newark, New Jersey
- Spouses: Brenda Petty (m. 1990; div. 1993) Gail Paschall (m. 1996; div. 2003)
- Children: 2
- Culinary career
- Cooking style: Southern cuisine
- Previous restaurant(s): Disney's Contemporary Resort Liberty Tree Tavern Prestonwood Country Club Benvenue Country Club in Rocky Mount, North Carolina Fakieh Poultry Farms in Saudi Arabia
- Television show(s): Extreme Chef The 700 Club I’ve Got Skills on ESPN iVillage Live
- Website: http://www.CookWithRome.com

Melvin Jerome "Rome" Brown (born July 6, 1967) is an American chef who has worked for Colin Powell, Carl XVI Gustaf of Sweden, Cam Newton, Nancy Kerrigan, Priscilla Presley, and was personal chef to Shaquille O'Neal. His expertise is in Southern United States cuisine.

In 1986 he enlisted in the United States Army as a cook and later was the area chef at Disney's Contemporary Resort.

== Personal life ==
Brown was born and raised in Newark, New Jersey and currently lives in Rocky Mount, North Carolina. He has two children Jasmine and Joshua who appeared with him on The 700 Club in 2007.

== Publications ==
Brown has authored two cookbooks: Eat Like A Celebrity: Southern Cuisine with a Gourmet Twist (released December 2013) and Carolina Soul: The down home taste of the Carolinas released (April 10, 2018). His first cookbook Eat Like A Celebrity: Southern Cuisine with a Gourmet Twist, was awarded 2014 Cookbook of the Year at the African American Literary Awards Show.

== Television ==
Brown has cooked for many celebrities and heads of state, including Shaquille O'Neal and the current King of Sweden. He has also made television appearances as a competitor on Extreme Chef on the Food Network, two appearances on The 700 Club where he was interviewed by Pat Robertson, and I've Got Skills on ESPN.
