= Tactile graphic =

Image that can be read by touch

Tactile graphics, including tactile pictures, tactile diagrams, tactile maps, and tactile graphs, are images that use raised surfaces so that a visually impaired person can feel them. They are used to convey non-textual information such as maps, paintings, graphs and diagrams.

Tactile graphics can be seen as a subset of accessible images. Images can be made accessible to the visually impaired in various ways, such as verbal description, sound, or haptic (tactile) feedback. One of the most common uses for tactile graphics is the production of tactile maps.

== Tactile maps ==
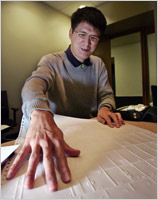
Paper tactile map

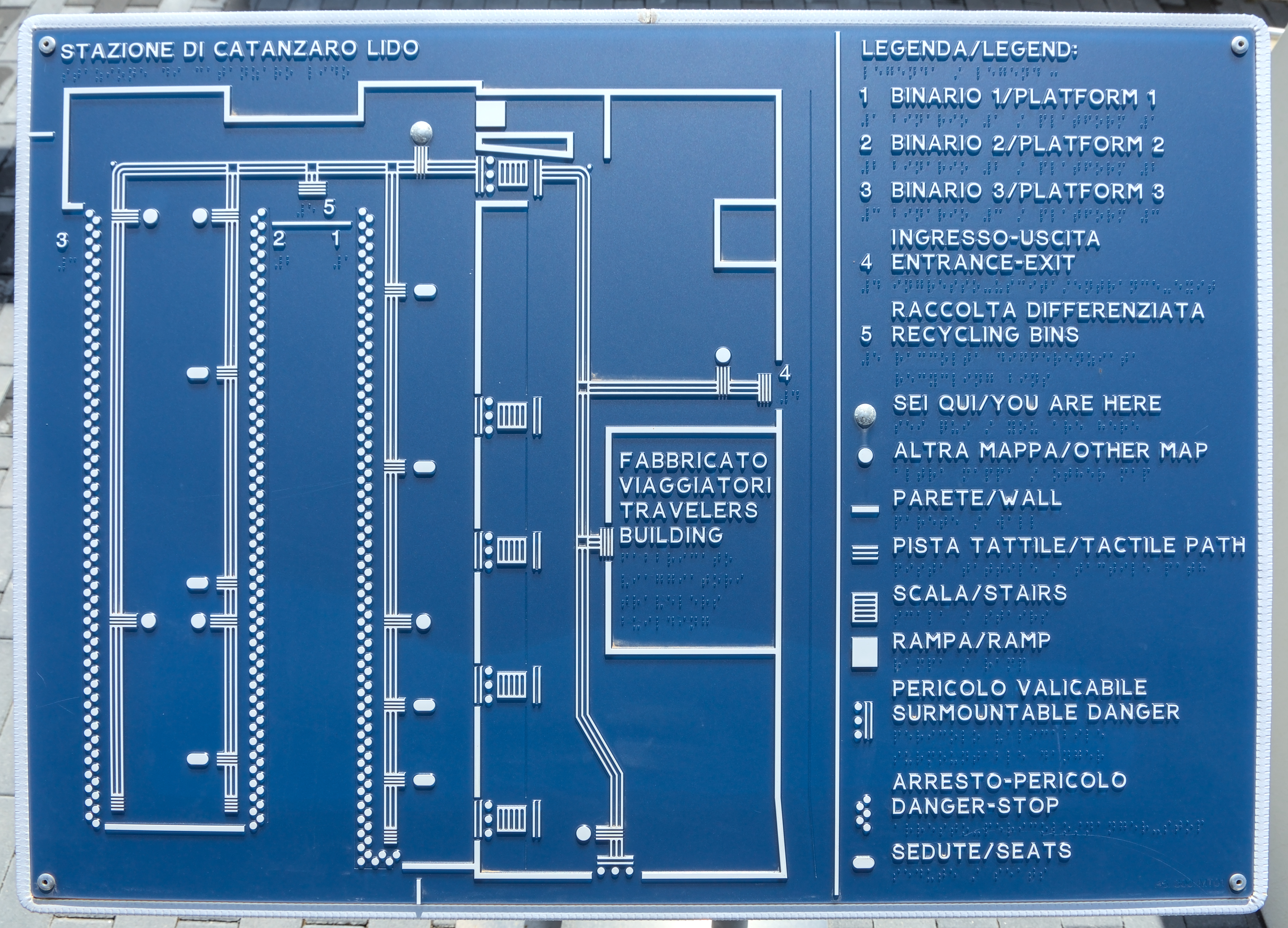
A tactile map with embossed writing and braille, in a train station in Italy

The types and forms of tactile maps began with the oldest and most rudimentary of a mixed media format. This tactile map is produced by simply attaching objects to a substrate to represent different items or symbols. More recent tactile maps are produced by computers through different means such as ink-jet printers.

Thermoform is one of the most common methods of producing tactile maps. This process is also known as vacuum forming. Thermoform maps or plans are created from a process where a sheet of plastic is heated and vacuumed on top of a model or master. The master can be made from many substances, although certain materials are more durable than others. Since this process involves creating a mold, it is somewhat time-consuming.

Swell paper has a special coating of heat-reactive chemicals. Microcapsules of alcohol implanted in the paper fracture when exposed to heat and make the surface of the paper inflate. Placing black ink on the paper prior to a heat process provides control over the raised surface areas. This type of map is not as robust as the Thermoform map, but can be produced with less effort and expense.

Modified Braille embossers can also be used to produce tactile paper maps.

Ink-jet tactile maps are made by layering a specially designed ink. Each layer is cured by UV irradiation before the next layer is added. This technology is an offshoot of other industries, such as circuit board manufacturing and biomedical applications.

The substrate for tactile maps is a very important attribute, since different materials can enhance or reduce legibility and durability. Several types of substrates can be used to produce a tactile map. These include rough and smooth plastic, rough and smooth paper, microcapsule paper, Braillon, and aluminum. Many factors should be considered when choosing a substrate; these include but are not limited to function, durability, and portability.

Tactile map variables: Just as Jacques Bertin retinal variables help determine how visual maps are produced; tactile maps have a formula as well. Although researchers have not standardized tactile map variables, these nine are usually included depending on the substrate: vibration, flutter, pressure, temperature, size, shape, texture/grain, orientation, and elevation.

Typical tactile elevations: Thermoformed maps usually have an elevation of at least 1mm. Swell Paper averages 0.5 mm and braille embossers have a range from 0.25–1 mm. Ink-jet printers can be controlled to vary elevation as needed. A (2009) study conducted by Sandra Jehoel tested various height levels and estimated that preferred tactile elevations fall between 40 and 80 micrometres depending on the substrate background, shape of the object and smoothness of lines. Symbols such as a triangle, square and a circle should have a minimum base line length of 6.4, 5.0 and 5.5 mm respectively for proper recognition.

Audio tactile maps or graphic tablets are interactive devices. Electronic tactile talking touch pad instruments use Macromedia Flash software with audio files to convey information to the blind or visually impaired user. As the user's finger engages a feature or symbol a recording provides information about the object, symbol or area. For example, the sound of splashing water can be used for areas such as rivers or oceans. This format has great potential for transmitting information over the Internet which can be downloaded to a computer or hand-held device.

A great deal of hardware already exists that can be used by the blind or visually impaired to interact with computer screen graphics. A vibrating mouse or other force feedback devices can be adapted to turn any visual software generated map into a hybrid tactile map. The interactive signal to a device can be varied when crossing a boundary or symbol.

High resolution refreshable braille displays containing 1,500 to 12,000 pixels are already available in the market. Graphic braille displays available in the market is DV-2 (from KGS) with 1,536 pixels, Hyperbraille with 7,200 pixels and TACTISPLAY Table/Walk (from Tactisplay Corp.) with 2,400/12,000 pixels respectively. TACTISPLAY table has total 12,000 pixels arranged in 120x100.

Zoom maps are a recently developed tactile map. These maps are designed specifically for those who can read braille and have had no previous interaction with tactile maps. The term zoom is comparable to a zoom-able visual raster internet map. A country is divided into regions on the first map then the next zoomed map will have a breakdown of the regions and so forth until a city level is reached. These successive maps rely on a dependable texture as the map zoom progresses. This produces a familiarity as one zooms from the preceding map. This is achieved in many instances with line orientation, area and consistent shape. The Braille text on the map is placed next to a rectangular textured legend for area identification.
