= Carole E. Straw =

Carole Ellen Straw
- Occupations: Professor; Historian
- Awards: John Nicholas Brown Prize (1992)

Academic background
- Education: University of California, Berkeley
- Thesis: 'Sweet Tortures and Delectable Pains': The Grammar of Complementarity in the Works of Gregory the Great (1979)
- Doctoral advisor: Gerard Caspary, Peter Brown, and Robert Rogers

Academic work
- Discipline: History
- Sub-discipline: Christian history; Thought in late antiquity and the early middle ages
- Institutions: University of Chicago; Mount Holyoake College

Carole Ellen Straw is Professor Emerita of History at Mount Holyoke College. She researches various aspects of Christian history and thought in late antiquity and the early middle ages, with particular emphasis on Gregory the Great and Christian martyrdom. She has worked at the University of Chicago and Mount Holyoke College and received the John Nicholas Brown Prize in 1992 for her book Gregory the Great: Perfection in Imperfection.

== Career ==
She completed her doctoral studies at the University of California, Berkeley in 1979, under the direction of Gerard Caspary, Peter Brown, and Robert Rogers. Her thesis was titled 'Sweet Tortures and Delectable Pains': The Grammar of Complementarity in the Works of Gregory the Great. Following a year as a Harper Teaching Fellow at the University of Chicago, in 1980 she began teaching at Mount Holyoake College, where she has remained ever since. Her first monograph, Gregory the Great: Perfection in Imperfection (1988) won the John Nicholas Brown Prize from the Medieval Academy of America in 1992. The prize is awarded to authors whose first book or monograph related to medieval studies is judged to be "outstanding".

She was made a fellow of the American Council of Learned Societies in 1991. She is also the author of numerous publications on Gregory the Great, the history of Christian martyrdom and its legacies, and other themes in ascetic and monastic thought.
