= Peter Brown (historian) =

Irish historian (born 1935)

Peter Brown FBA
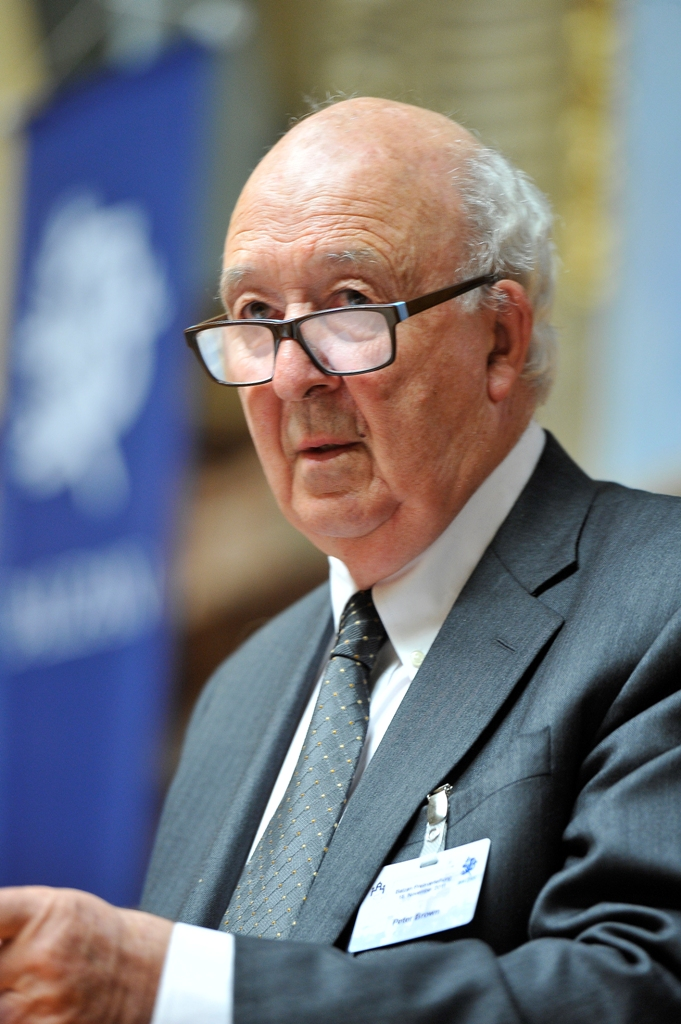
- Brown in 2011
- Born: Peter Robert Lamont Brown; 26 July 1935 (age 91); Dublin, Irish Free State
- Occupation: Historian
- Spouses: Patricia Fortini (m. 1980; div. 1989): Betsy Brown
- Children: 2
- Awards: Heineken Prize for History (1994); Kluge Prize (2008); Balzan Prize (2011); Dan David Prize (2015)

Academic background
- Education: Shrewsbury School
- Alma mater: New College, Oxford
- Influences: Henri-Irénée Marrou; André Piganiol; W. H. C. Frend

Academic work
- Institutions: All Souls College, Oxford; Royal Holloway, University of London; University of California, Berkeley; Princeton University
- Notable works: Augustine of Hippo: A Biography (1967; 2000); The World of Late Antiquity (1971); The Cult of the Saints (1981); The Body and Society (1988); Through the Eye of a Needle (2012)

Peter Robert Lamont Brown (born 26 July 1935) is an Irish historian. He is the Rollins Professor of History Emeritus at Princeton University. Brown is credited with having brought coherence to the field of Late Antiquity, and is often regarded as the inventor of said field. His work has concerned, in particular, the religious culture of the later Roman Empire and early medieval Europe, and the relation between religion and society.

== Early life and education ==
Peter Brown was born in Dublin, Irish Free State, in 1935, to a Scots-Irish family who were members of the Church of Ireland. Until 1939, he spent winter and spring each year in the Anglo-Egyptian Sudan, where his father worked as a railway engineer based at Khartoum. For the rest of the year, he would return with his mother to Bray, in County Wicklow, near Dublin. Following the outbreak of war, Brown and his mother remained in Ireland, though his father did not return finally until 1948. Brown has a stutter and came later in life to be noted as an example of a successful public speaker with a stutter.

Brown has written and spoken about the influence of the Sudanese connection on several occasions. Speaking to the Daily Princetonian, he has remarked:

Living in the Sudan put in me a love of the Middle East, a real interest in it, distant memories of a very sunny world with large, dark Sudanese servants in long white robes", combined with memories of "hippopotami, crocodiles, and camels under starry skies.

After his father had returned to Ireland, a "handbook of Sudanese Courtesy Customs, containing delicate Arabic phrases of greeting and polite enquiry, was prominent on his bookshelf, as was a deluxe edition of T. E. Lawrence's The Seven Pillars of Wisdom, which I would read, from cover to cover, every time that I returned home on holiday from my school in England." Such influences, with "roots deep in my childhood, already ensured, perhaps, that both religion and the 'exotic' (the non-European and, by implication, the non-classical) were both too large, too ever-present and too rich for their intrusion into the classical world to be dismissed out of hand, as unambiguously negative symptoms of decline. The power of both had begun to puzzle and intrigue me. The collapse of an enlightened empire might, indeed, be a catastrophic event, for all I knew; but it was unlikely to be uninteresting.

Brown was initially educated at Aravon School – now closed but, at that time, a distinguished preparatory school in Bray, County Wicklow, where he first studied Latin and French. Brown was then educated at Shrewsbury School and New College, Oxford. At Shrewsbury, Brown expected to concentrate on sciences, but first studied Ancient Greek and turned in earnest to the study of history:

I myself had become a keen amateur astronomer, and had re-invented gunpowder to the detriment of my aunt's carpet. I fully intended to enter the Science stream of my new school. My housemaster summoned me to his study. In between puffs of his pipe, he announced with utter certainty: 'Brown, you did too well in [the] Entrance [examination] to do Science. You shall do ... Greek.' And Greek I did, if only for one year, before taking the Junior Certificate and then lapsing from the high calling of a classical scholar in the English Public School tradition into the study of mere History.

When asked to comment on his intellectual formation, Brown has also indicated that he completed his public schooling a year early, returning to Ireland (as he had done for school holidays) in 1952, the year he turned 17. It was then in Dublin that he read Michael Rostovtzeff's § The Social and Economic History of the Roman Empire (1926), which he borrowed from the lending library of the Royal Dublin Society at Ballsbridge. The academic year 1952–1953 was a "hiatus" for Brown, between school and university, during which he learned to type at a secretarial school, and received German lessons from an academic at Trinity College Dublin who had been a refugee from Nazi Germany.

In 1953, Brown took up a scholarship to read Modern History at New College, leaving in 1956. Most of his degree was "devoted to English History in its entirety and to the European High Middle Ages, from 919 to 1127", but in his final academic year, he undertook a Special Subject on The Age of Augustine, and was particularly influenced by the writings of Marrou and Piganiol. That Special Subject had a profound influence on Brown:

I was thrilled by the glimpse which both authors offered of the sheer resilience of a pre-Christian society and culture at the very moment of the triumph of the Christian church within the Roman empire. Institutions and powerful bodies of ideas, that I had known only in the medieval and post-Reformation periods — and many of which, in their modern form, still hung, like chill clouds, above the heart of any Irish boy, Catholic or Protestant — were shown to have originated first in a very distant, ancient world.

== Career ==
=== Employment and professional memberships ===
Following his graduation Brown began, but did not complete, a doctoral thesis under the external supervision of Arnaldo Momigliano (at that time professor of ancient history at University College London). The potential he had shown as an undergraduate was recognized by the award of the Harmsworth Senior Scholarship at Merton College, Oxford, and a seven-year Prize Fellowship at All Souls College, Oxford. At a time when it was normally possible to remain in the college after the Prize Fellowship, All Souls College subsequently elected him a research fellow in 1963 and a senior research fellow in 1970. The Modern History Faculty of the University of Oxford appointed him a special lecturer in 1970 and a reader (ad hominem) in 1973. From 1972 to 1975 he held a lectureship at Merton College. He was elected a fellow of the British Academy in 1971. Brown left Oxford to become professor of modern history and head of the Department of History at Royal Holloway College in the University of London (1975–1978). He subsequently left Britain to become professor of classics and history in the University of California at Berkeley (1978–1986) and then Philip and Beulah Rollins Professor of History at Princeton University (1986–2011). He was elected a fellow of the American Academy of Arts and Sciences in 1979, a fellow of the Medieval Academy of America in 1988, and a resident member of the American Philosophical Society in 1995.

Before joining the tenured faculty at UC Berkeley and Princeton, Brown held visiting professorships at both institutions: at UC Berkeley in 1975, and at Princeton in 1983–1986. He has also held visiting professorships at UCLA and in Italy. Other engagements as a visiting teacher have taken Brown to Toronto in the 1970s and, since 2000, to Hungary and Iceland. At Princeton, Brown was given the President's Award for Distinguished Teaching in 2000.

=== Speaking engagements ===
Brown has delivered several named lecture series. These include the Carl Newell Jackson Lectures at Harvard University (1976); the Haskell Lectures at the University of Chicago (1978); the ACLS Lectures in the History of Religion (1981–82); the Curti Lectures at the University of Wisconsin, Madison (1988); the Tanner Lectures at Cambridge and Yale (1993 and 1996 respectively); the Menahem Stern Lectures in Jerusalem (2000); the Lectures in Human Sciences at the Institute for Human Sciences in Vienna (2012); and the James W. Richard Lectures at the University of Virginia (2012).

Brown has also delivered a multitude of named single lectures. These include national academic occasions in the UK and US: the Raleigh Lecture in History in the British Academy (1992); and the Charles Homer Haskins Lecture ("A Life of Learning") for the American Council of Learned Societies (2003).

Other named lectures by Brown include the Stenton Lecture at Reading University (1976); the Sigmund H Danziger Jr Memorial Lecture at the University of Chicago (1997); a Presidential Lecture at Stanford University (2002); the Clark Lecture at Trinity College, Cambridge (2004); the Gennadius Library Lecture at the American School of Classical Studies in Athens (2007); the Fr. Alexander Schmemann Lecture at St. Vladimir's Orthodox Theological Seminary, NY (2013); the Annual Distinguished Lecture in Religion at Rutgers University (2013); the Nicolai Rubinstein Lecture at Queen Mary College, University of London (2013); the Patricia H. Labalme Friends of the Library Lecture at the American Academy in Rome (2013); the Burke Lecture on Religion and Society, University of California, San Diego (2014); the Corish Lecture at Maynooth College, Ireland (2014); the Etienne Gilson Lecture at the Pontifical Institute of Medieval Studies, Toronto (2014); and the inaugural Costan Lecture at Georgetown University (2014).

Brown has also been a named lecturer, usually in retrospect, in all the universities at which he has held substantive posts: lectures include the Magie Lecture at Princeton (1991); the Pritchett Lecture at UC Berkeley (1993); the Hayes Robinson Lecture at Royal Holloway College, University of London (1997); the Ronald Syme Lecture at Wolfson College, Oxford, and the Dacre Lecture in the History Faculty at Oxford (2006 and 2010 respectively).

In 2007, Brown gave an inaugural talk at the opening of the Oxford Centre for Late Antiquity. In 2015 he was hosted by the Group for the Study of Late Antiquity at the Hebrew University of Jerusalem, in a public discussion with Paula Fredriksen.

Brown has also frequently been a keynote speaker at conferences and congresses. These include the International Congress of Medieval Studies at Western Michigan University, Kalamazoo (1986); the International Medieval Congress at Leeds (1999); the Sewanee Medieval Colloquium (2012); and the First Annual Symposium on Medieval and Renaissance Studies at St. Louis University (2013). He gave the inaugural address at the first Coloquio Internacional "Nuevas perspectivas sobre la Antigüedad tardía" in Segovia (2009).

=== Editorial work ===
For several decades, Brown has been General Editor of the book series "The Transformation of the Classical Heritage", published by the University of California Press. The first volume in the series was published in 1981. The full published list to date now exceeds fifty-five titles.

=== Research grants ===
Following his earlier books, Brown has received some prestigious and substantial research grants. These include the MacArthur Fellowship in 1982 and the Distinguished Achievement Award for scholars in the humanities from the Andrew W. Mellon Foundation in 2001.

== Research overview ==
Brown, who has a knowledge of at least 26 languages, has been instrumental in the development of the study of late antiquity as a field. Within this broad field, he has also been central in the study of Augustine, monasticism (both the eremitical "holy man" and coenobitic alternatives), the cult of the saints and the practice of sexual renunciation. More recently, he has made fundamental contributions to the study of power relations in late Roman society and to the study of financial giving. He has produced a steady stream of articles (several being classics in the field) since 1961, and a steady series of influential books since 1967.

Janet Nelson, the distinguished British historian of the early Middle Ages, has said: "He took the study of medieval history into fields of cultural history and social history, social psychological history. He was interested in religion but not in an old-fashioned ecclesiastical history, institutional sort of way, but what made people think in this way: how did they conceptualise God? How did they think about religious symbols and rituals in the ways that they did? Why did these things change? That was his agenda. He wrote mostly about late antiquity, the very early period, but he sometimes ventured into the Middle Ages and whenever he did he transformed the scene. The great area he's famous for doing is the cult of the saints."

Drawing on her interview with Brown, Ruby Shao has remarked: "Brown cites the balance of his scholarship between eastern and western Christianity as his proudest accomplishment. Few scholars research both equally, as the task demands mastery of different languages and intuitions. His commitment has challenged him throughout his career to break into new territory, such as by examining the Desert Fathers, Syriac poetry, and languages like Greek and Coptic."

=== 1956 to 1971 ===
Following his exposure to the works of Marrou and Piganiol as an undergraduate, and shortly after joining All Souls College as a Prize Fellow, Brown travelled in Italy in 1957–8, doing research at the British School in Rome. During that time, he was especially influenced by the work of Santo Mazzarino, which provided a stimulus for Brown's earliest lectures at Oxford, on return from Italy in 1958. Other early influences were Norman Hepburn Baynes, William Frend and A. H. M. Jones.

Brown's earliest research articles concerned the Christianization of the senatorial aristocracy of Rome (1961), and the phenomena of religious dissent and coercion in late Roman North Africa (1961, 1963). From there, he turned to the study of Augustine's own views on the state (1963) and its use of coercion in matters of religion (1964). Italy and Africa in the fourth and early fifth centuries provided the principal context for the life of Augustine, which became the subject of Brown's substantial first book – Augustine of Hippo: A Biography (1967). This was followed by related articles that explored both the Pelagian milieu in Italy (1968, 1970) and the relation between Christianity and local culture in Roman Africa (1968).

Following the completion of Augustine, however, Brown felt "free, at last" to take a wider approach to Late Antiquity, and to turn in particular to the Near East and Central Asia. In 1964, A. H. M. Jones's vast magnum opus on The Later Roman Empire, 284–602: A Social, Economic and Administrative Survey had appeared, on which Brown wrote a long and important review article for the Economic History Review (1967). In addition, as Augustine had been a Manichaean for many years, Brown already had a natural route into the religious history of the eastern half of the later Roman Empire and the Persian Empire. An article on "The Diffusion of Manichaeism in the Roman Empire" (1969) reflected the direction of his interests, and was spectacularly corroborated when, shortly after, the Cologne Mani-Codex came to light.

In 1969, Geoffrey Barraclough (as General Editor of the Thames & Hudson "Library of European Civilization" series) approached Brown with a view to commissioning a book on late antiquity – and Brown has since noted that it might well have been Barraclough who suggested "The World of Late Antiquity" as a title. At this point, Brown engaged increasingly with the work of Henri Pirenne – and also with that of the French Annales School, in particular Fernand Braudel. Their work, combined with the eastward shift in his interests, prompted Brown to think increasingly of the Mediterranean as "truly distinctive".

Brown's interest in analyzing culture and religion as social phenomena, and as part of a wider context of historical change, had already been fostered by engagement with the work of Baynes, Frend and Jones. But the Annales' influence in Brown's work can be seen in his increasing use of anthropology and sociology as interpretative tools for historical analysis. Brown was influenced by Anglo-American anthropology, himself noting the role of both a largely British tradition of social anthropology and a largely American tradition of cultural anthropology.

=== 1971 to present ===
Brown's views slightly shifted in the eighties. In articles and new editions Brown said that his earlier work, which had deconstructed many of the religious aspects of his field of study, needed to be reassessed. His later work shows a deeper appreciation for the specifically Christian layers of his subjects of study.

His most recent research focuses on wealth and poverty in late antiquity, especially in Christian writers.

== Personal life ==
In 1980, Brown married American art historian Patricia Fortini, with whom he has two children. The couple divorced in 1989.

Brown lives near the campus of Princeton University with his second wife Betsy, a scholar of the Reformation. In his 2023 memoir Journeys of the Mind, he writes that he wakes up early every morning “to say my prayers and to turn, before dawn’s early light, to reading ancient languages.”

== Principal publications ==
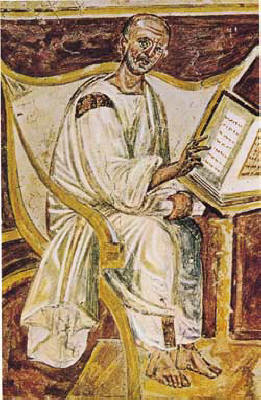
A 6th-century picture of Augustine of Hippo

=== Augustine of Hippo: A Biography (1967; 2000) ===
Brown's biography of Augustine of Hippo was widely acclaimed. Reviewing it in the Journal of Theological Studies, William Frend – with whom Brown had had a courteous but critical difference of opinion on the religious history of Roman Africa – wrote: "This is a superb book, an intensely personal interpretation of its central figure, but one in which the scholar's full range of skills, those of the historian, the philosopher, and human psychologist have been brought to bear, sustained throughout by a profound knowledge of Augustine's writings and those of his contemporaries, as well as of modern critical works. The entire compass of the life and thought of the later Roman Empire in the West is its canvas."

The idiosyncrasies of the book did not go unnoticed. Another great master of Augustinian studies, the Rev. Henry Chadwick, remarked that Brown's book was a "biography without the theology" – a judgment that Brown has accepted as "fair". For this reason, among Anglophone students, Brown's book has often been read hand in hand with Gerald Bonner's St Augustine of Hippo: Life and Controversies, which first appeared four years earlier, in 1963, and which Bonner updated in subsequent editions.

Equally, however, it was Brown's distinctive and subtle de-emphasis of theological content, combined with his use of psychoanalytic insight – which was then highly unusual in the study of an ancient figure – that helped to set Augustine convincingly, as an individual, within a historical landscape. This was noticed by Richard Southern, who praised Brown for "bringing Augustine out of the tomb of theological doctrine, and setting his mind and emotions working before our eyes."

Brown published a new edition in 2000, closing with two new chapters, one focusing on new evidence and the other on new interpretations.

=== The World of Late Antiquity (1971) ===
In his second book The World of Late Antiquity (1971), Brown offered a radically new interpretation of the entire period between the second and eighth centuries AD. The traditional interpretation of this period was centred around the idea of decadence from a 'golden age', classical civilisation, after the famous work of Edward Gibbon The History of the Decline and Fall of the Roman Empire (1779). On the contrary, Brown proposed to look at this period in positive terms, arguing that Late Antiquity was a period of immense cultural innovation.

=== "The Rise and Function of the Holy Man in Late Antiquity" (1971) ===
His most celebrated early paper concerned the figure of the 'holy man'. According to Brown, the charismatic, Christian ascetics (holy men) were particularly prominent in the late Roman empire and the early Byzantine world as mediators between local communities and the divine. This relationship expressed the importance of patronage in the Roman social system, which was taken over by the Christian ascetics. But more importantly, Brown argues, the rise of the holy man was the result of a deeper religious change that affected not only Christianity but also other religions of the late antique period – namely the need for a more personal access to the divine.

=== The Body and Society (1988) ===
Published in 1988, Peter Brown's The Body and Society was a groundbreaking study of the marriage and sexual practices of early Christians in the ancient Mediterranean and Near East. Brown focuses on the practice of permanent sexual renunciation-continence, celibacy, and lifelong virginity in Christian circles from the first to the fifth centuries A.D. and traces early Christians' preoccupations with sexuality and the body in the work of the period's great writers.

The Body and Society questions how theological views on sexuality and the human body both mirrored and shaped relationships between men and women, Roman aristocracy and slaves, and the married and the celibate. Brown discusses Tertullian, Valentinus, Clement of Alexandria, Origen, Constantine, the Desert Fathers, Jerome, Ambrose, and Augustine, among others, and considers asceticism and society in the Eastern Empire, martyrdom and prophecy, gnostic spiritual guidance, promiscuity among the men and women of the church, monks and marriage in Egypt, the ascetic life of women in fourth-century Jerusalem, and the body and society in the early Middle Ages. In his new introduction, Brown reflects on his work's reception in the scholarly community.

=== Through the Eye of a Needle (2012) ===
Brown's longest book to date, Through the Eye of a Needle concerns attitudes to philanthropic giving in the Latin West in Late Antiquity. Divided into five parts, the core of the book – the long Parts II and III – focuses on two generations between about AD370 and 430, when a rich diversity of views gave way to an increasing polarization of thought brought on by the debate between Augustine and the Pelagians. Parts I and IV–V place this highly focused study in the much wider frame of the social structures of the fourth, fifth and sixth centuries.

== Honours ==
Brown has received formal recognition for his academic achievements in at least twelve countries on three continents.

=== Honorary degrees and college fellowships ===
Brown has received some twenty honorary degrees. From outside the US, he has received honorary doctorates from the University of Fribourg, Switzerland (1974), Trinity College Dublin (1990), the University of Pisa (2001), Cambridge (2004), the Central European University in Budapest (2005), Oxford (2006), King's College London (2008), The Hebrew University of Jerusalem (2010), the Aristotle University in Thessaloniki (2010), and the University of St Andrews (2014). His US honorary doctorates include the University of Chicago (1978), Wesleyan University (1993), Tulane (1994), Columbia University (2001), Harvard University (2002), Southern Methodist University (2004), Yale University (2006), University of Notre Dame (2008), Amherst College (2009), and St Vladimir's Orthodox Theological Seminary, NY (2013).

Brown is an honorary fellow of Royal Holloway College in the University of London (1997), and of New College at Oxford University (1998).

=== Prizes ===
Brown has received several major prizes, including the Heineken Prize for History from the Royal Netherlands Academy of Arts and Sciences (1994), the Ausonius Prize for Ancient History from the University of Trier (1999) and the Premio Anaxilao from the Municipality of Reggio di Calabria (1999). In 2008 he was the co-winner, with Indian historian Romila Thapar, of the semi-regular Kluge Prize for Lifetime Achievement in the Study of Humanity, from the US Library of Congress. In 2011, Brown was awarded the prestigious International Balzan Prize for the Humanities, for his works on Graeco-Roman antiquity. He shared the Dan David Prize in the category of "Retrieving the Past: Historians and their Sources" in 2015.

=== Learned centres, societies and academies ===
In addition to the professional memberships acquired during his career in the UK and US, Brown has received honorific recognition from a number of other learned bodies.

Brown is a foreign member of the Royal Netherlands Academy of Arts and Sciences (1991); a corresponding member of the Royal Academy of Letters in Barcelona (1997); an honorary fellow of the Italian Association for the Study of Sanctity, Cults and Hagiography; an honorary member of the Royal Irish Academy (2010); a foreign member of the Accademia Nazionale dei Lincei in Italy (2015); and a fellow of the Ecclesiastical History Society in the UK (2016).

Brown is also honorary president (from 2012) of the Centro Internacional de Estudios sobre la Antigüedad Tardía 'Teodosio el Grande', in the Universidad Nacional de Educación a Distancia, at Segovia.

=== Foreign public recognition ===
Brown is a Chevalier of the Order of Arts and Letters in France (1996).

=== Book prizes ===
Brown has won several distinguished book prizes. Augustine of Hippo: A Biography (1967) won the Arts Council of Great Britain Prize. The Body and Society: Men, Women, and Sexual Renunciation in Early Christianity (1988) won the Vursell Award of the American Academy of Arts and Letters, and the Ralph Waldo Emerson Award of Phi Beta Kappa. Through the Eye of a Needle: Wealth, the Fall of Rome, and the Making of Christianity in the West, 350–550AD (2012) won the Jacques Barzun Prize in Cultural History from the American Philosophical Society, and the Philip Schaff Prize from the American Society of Church History. It also secured the R.R. Hawkins Award (the top prize in a tiered structure) at the American publishing industry's annual PROSE Awards.

== Selected bibliography ==
=== Books ===
- Augustine of Hippo: A Biography (1967/2000) – ISBN 0-520-22757-3, new edition, with new epilogue, ISBN 978-0-520-22757-6
- The World of Late Antiquity: AD 150–750 (1971/1989) – ISBN 0-393-95803-5
- The Making of Late Antiquity (1978) – ISBN 0-674-54321-1
- The Cult of the Saints: Its Rise and Function in Latin Christianity (1981) – ISBN 0-226-07622-9
- Society & the Holy in Late Antiquity (1982) – ISBN 978-0-520-06800-1
- The Body and Society: Men, Women, and Sexual Renunciation in Early Christianity (1988) – ISBN 0-231-06101-3
- Power and Persuasion: Towards a Christian Empire (1992)
- Authority and the Sacred: Aspects of the Christianisation of the Roman world (1995) – ISBN 0-521-49904-6
- The Rise of Western Christendom (1996/2003) – ISBN 0-631-22138-7
- Poverty and Leadership in the Later Roman Empire (2002)
- Through the Eye of a Needle: Wealth, the Fall of Rome, and the Making of Christianity in the West 350–550 AD (2012)
- The Ransom of the Soul: Afterlife and Wealth in Early Western Christianity (2015)
- Treasure in Heaven: The Holy Poor in Early Christianity (2016)
- Journeys of the Mind: A Life in History (2023)--ISBN 9780691242286
