= Patricia Brown =

Patricia Brown may refer to:

- Patricia Brown (baseball) (1931–2013), American baseball player
- Patricia Brown (engineer) (born 1928), American chemical engineer
- Trish Brown (born 1963), American education advocate, public relations practitioner, journalist, and entrepreneur
- Patricia Fortini Brown (born 1936), American art historian
- Patricia Brown (actress) from Danielle Steel's A Perfect Stranger

== See also ==
- Pat Brown (disambiguation)
