= The World of Late Antiquity =

1971 book by historian Peter Brown

- Author: Peter Brown (historian)
- Publisher: Harcourt Brace Jovanovich
- Publication date: 1971
- ISBN: 9780151988853

The World of Late Antiquity is a 1971 book by historian Peter Brown. The book was one of the first in the anglophone world to consider late antiquity as a distinct historical era. In 2014, the Folio Society republished an illustrated edition, with an introduction by historian Christopher Kelly. It was reissued by Thames and Hudson as part of their World of Art series in 2024.
