= Patrick Brown =

Patrick Brown may refer to:

- Patrick Brown (cricketer) (born 1998), English cricketer
- Patrick Brown (ice hockey) (born 1992), American ice hockey player
- Patrick Brown (journalist), British-Canadian journalist with the Canadian Broadcasting Corporation
- Patrick Brown (Canadian politician) (born 1978), Canadian politician and mayor of Brampton, Ontario, Canada
- Patrick Brown (Northern Irish politician), Northern Irish politician
- Patrick Brown (photographer) (born 1969), Australian photojournalist, recipient of World Press Award 2018
- Sleepy Brown (Patrick Brown, born 1970), American R&B singer, songwriter, and record producer
- Patrick J. Brown (1952-2001), American firefighter, died in the September 11 attacks
- Patrick O. Brown (born 1954), American professor of biochemistry at Stanford University
- Patrick (Bischoff) Brown (born 1978), American engineer, producer and studio owner
- Patrick Brown (American football) (born 1986), American football offensive tackle
- Patrick Brown (civil servant) (born 1940), British civil servant and businessman
- Patsy Brown (Patrick A. Brown, 1872–1958), Irish-American maker of the uilleann pipes

== See also ==
- Pat Brown (disambiguation)
- Patrick Browne (disambiguation)
- Sir Patrick Broun, 1st Baronet (c. 1630–1688), of the Broun baronets
- Brown (surname), a surname of English and Scottish origin
