= Patrick Browne =

Patrick Browne may refer to:

- Patrick Browne (physician) (1720–1790), Irish physician and botanist
- Patrick Browne (cricketer) (born 1982), Barbadian cricketer
- Patrick Browne (Waterford politician) (1906–1991), Irish Fianna Fáil politician represented Waterford from 1965 to 1977
- Patrick Browne (Mayo politician) (1888–1970), Irish Fine Gael politician represented Mayo North from 1937 to 1954
- Patrick Browne (judge) (1907–1996), English judge
- Pat Browne (born 1963), Pennsylvanian state senator
- Pádraig de Brún (1889–1960), also called Patrick Joseph Monsignor Browne, Irish clergyman, mathematician, poet, and classical scholar

== See also ==
- Patrick Brown (disambiguation)
