= Pat Brown (disambiguation) =

Pat Brown may refer to:

- Pat Brown (1905–1996), American politician, Governor of the State of California
- Pat Brown (criminal profiler) (born 1955), American writer, criminal profiler and commentator
- Pat Crawford Brown (1929–2019), American television and film actress
- Pat "Sleepy" Brown (born 1970), American record producer with Society of Soul
- Pat Brown, lead singer of the American band Sing it Loud
- Pat Brown, fictional character in The Last Man on Earth (TV series)
- Pat Brown (cricketer) (born 1998), English cricketer
- "The Legend of Pat Brown", a song by Orange County punk band The Vandals about a patron of the Cuckoo's Nest nightclub who was involved in a violent altercation with the police.

== See also ==
- Patricia Brown (disambiguation)
- Patrick Brown (disambiguation)
- Pat Browne (born 1963), American politician
