= André Piganiol =

French historian and archaeologist

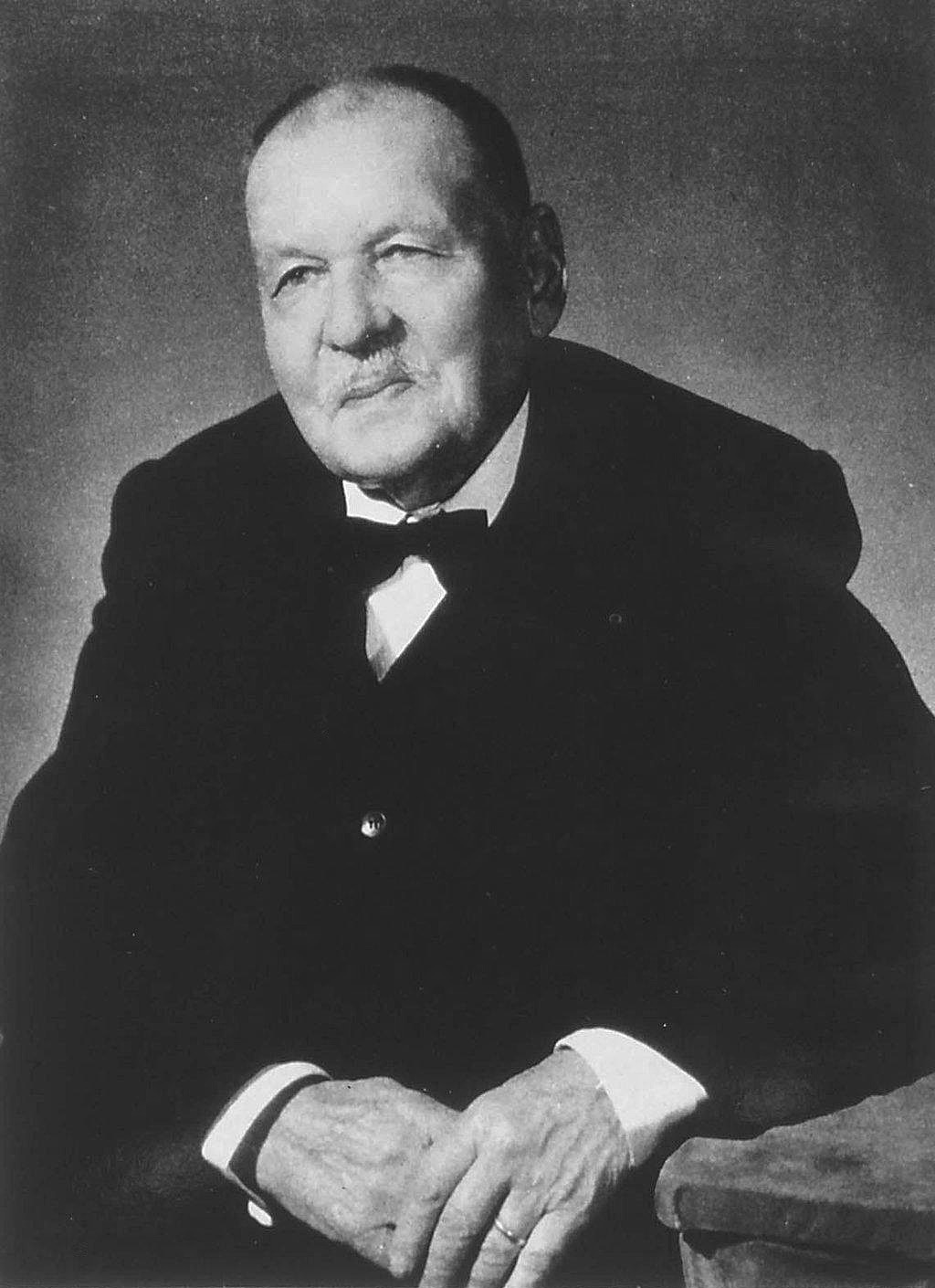
- Born: 17 January 1883; Le Havre, Normandy, France
- Died: 24 May 1968 (aged 85); Paris, France
- Occupations: Historian; Archaeologist

André Piganiol (17 January 1883 – 24 May 1968) was a French historian and archaeologist.

He was a professor at the University of Strasbourg and at the Sorbonne, then in 1942 became a professor of Roman civilisation at the Collège de France.

== Published works ==
- L'Impôt de capitation sous le Bas-Empire (1916)
- Essai sur les origines de Rome (1917)
- Recherches sur les jeux romains : notes d'archéologie et d'histoire religieuse (1923)
- La Conquête romaine (1927)
- Esquisse d'histoire romaine (1931)
- L'Empereur Constantin (1932)
- Histoire de Rome (1934)
- L'Empire chrétien, 325-395 (1947)
- Les Documents cadastraux de la colonie romaine d'Orange (1962)
- Le sac de Rome (1964)
- Scripta varia (3 volumes, 1973)
