= Late antiquity =

Post-classical antiquity in western Eurasia and Northern Africa

- AD 250 – 750
| Classical antiquity | Early Middle Ages; Post-classical history |
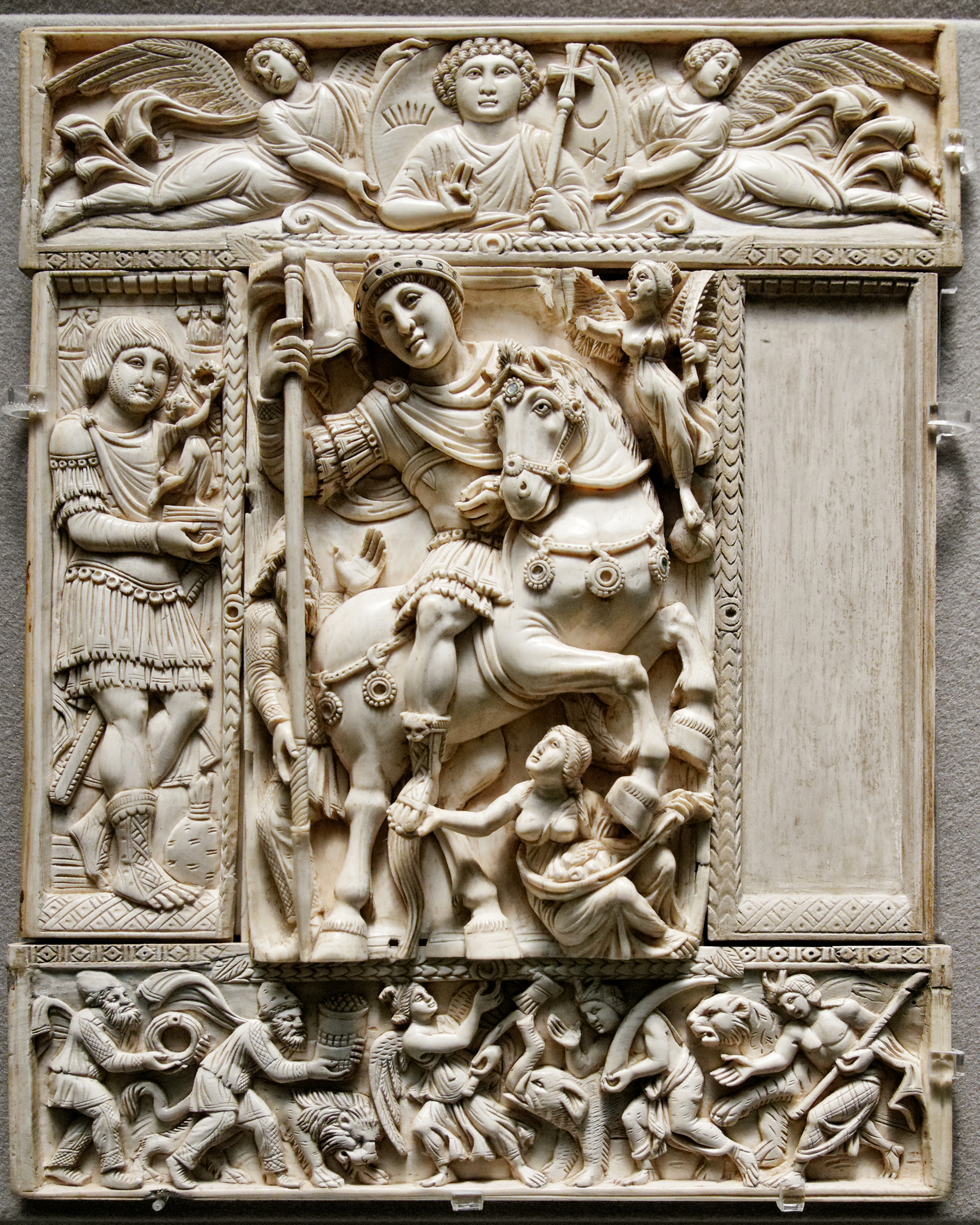
- The Barberini ivory, a late Leonid/Justinian Byzantine ivory leaf from an imperial diptych, from an imperial workshop in Constantinople in the first half of the 6th century (Louvre)
- Location: Mediterranean
- Key events: Crisis of the Third Century; Civil Wars of the Tetrarchy; Fall of the Western Roman Empire; Vandalic War; Gothic War; Byzantine–Sasanian wars Early Muslim conquests Byzantine–Lombard wars

Late antiquity is a time period between classical antiquity and the Early Middle Ages. The exact start and end dates are debatable. Late antiquity represents a cultural sphere covering much of the Mediterranean world, including parts of Europe and the Near East. As an approximate guide, the period can be thought of as spanning "c. 250–750".

Late antiquity was an era of massive political and religious transformation. As a time of significant cultural innovation and transformation, it produced a large body of late antique literature, art, and public architecture like the Hagia Sophia. Religiously, it marked the origins or ascendance of the three major monotheistic religions: Christianity, Rabbinic Judaism, and Islam, as well as the period when both the Bible and the Quran were canonised. Politically, it marked the end of the Western Roman Empire and the Sasanian Empire (the last Persian empire of antiquity), as well as the beginning of the Arab conquests and the formation of the Rashidun Caliphate. Meanwhile, the Byzantine Empire became a militarized and Christianized society.

== Terminology ==
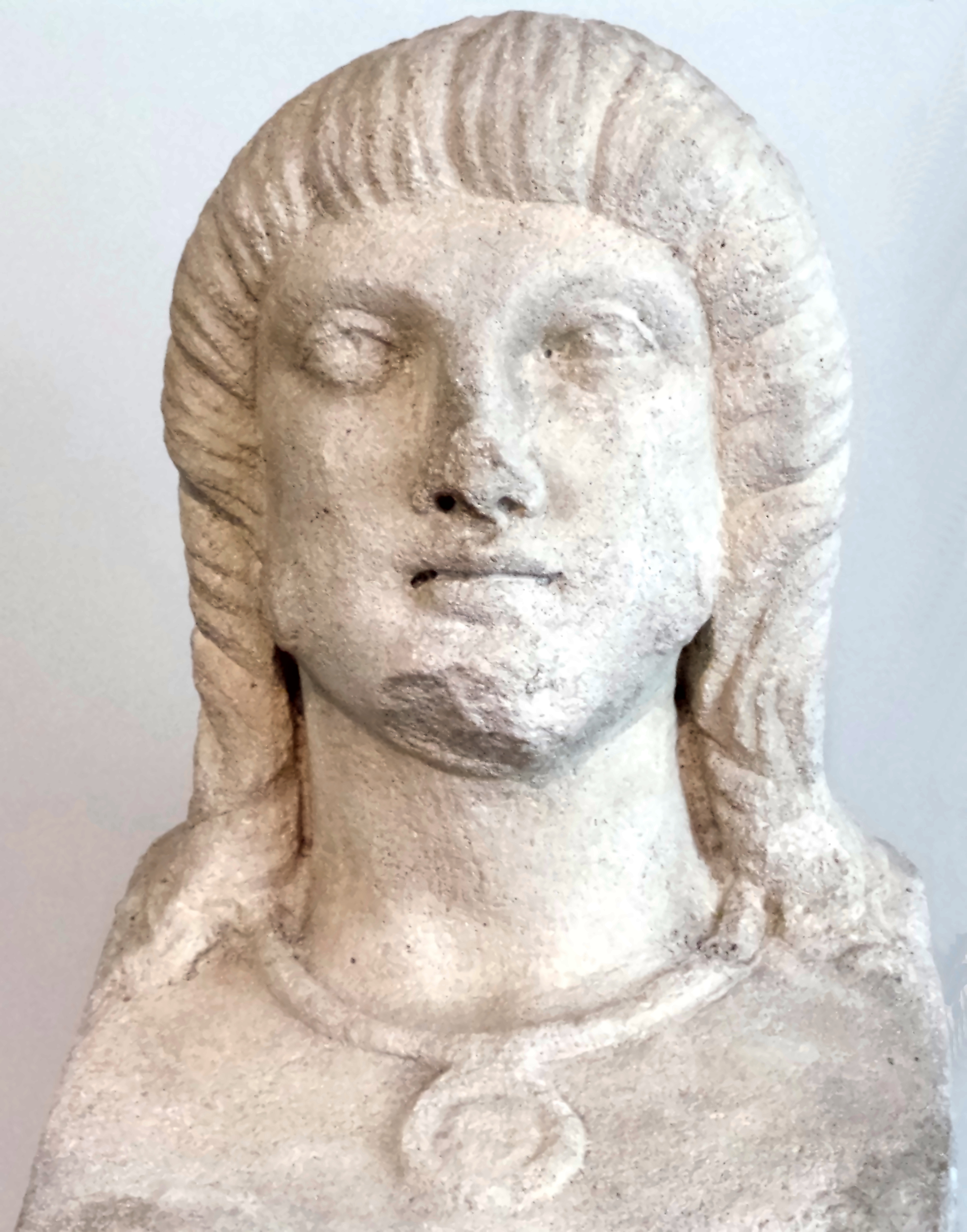
Late 4th-century Roman bust of a Germanic slave in Augusta Treverorum (Trier) in Belgica Prima, seat of the praetorian prefecture of Gaul (Rheinisches Landesmuseum Trier)

The term Spätantike, literally "late antiquity", has been used by German-speaking historians since its popularisation by Alois Riegl in the early 20th century. It was given currency in English partly by the writings of Peter Brown, whose book The World of Late Antiquity (1971) revised the Gibbon view of a stale and ossified Classical culture, in favour of a vibrant time of renewals and beginnings, and whose The Making of Late Antiquity offered a new paradigm of understanding the changes in Western culture of the time in order to confront Sir Richard Southern's The Making of the Middle Ages.

The continuities between the later Roman Empire, as it was reorganized by Diocletian (r. 284–305), and the Early Middle Ages are stressed by writers who wish to emphasize that the seeds of medieval culture were already developing in the Christianised empire, and that they continued to do so in the Eastern Roman or Byzantine Empire at least until the coming of Islam. Concurrently, some migrating Germanic tribes such as the Ostrogoths and Visigoths saw themselves as perpetuating the "Roman" tradition. While the usage "Late Antiquity" suggests that the social and cultural priorities of classical antiquity endured throughout Europe into the Middle Ages, the usage of "Early Middle Ages" or "Early Byzantine" emphasises a break with the classical past, and the term "Migration Period" tends to de-emphasize the disruptions in the former Western Roman Empire caused by the creation of Germanic kingdoms within its borders beginning with the foedus with the Goths in Aquitania in 418.

The general decline of population, technological knowledge and standards of living in Europe during this period became the archetypal example of societal collapse for writers from the Renaissance. As a result of this decline, and the relative scarcity of historical records from Europe in particular, the period from roughly the early fifth century until the Carolingian Renaissance (or later still) was referred to as the "Dark Ages". This term has mostly been abandoned as a name for a historiographical epoch, being replaced by "Late Antiquity" in the periodization of the late Western Roman Empire, the early Byzantine Empire and the Early Middle Ages. The term is seldom applied to Britain; the collapse of Roman rule in the island in the early fifth century is seen as a unique aspect of European history in the period.

== Main events ==
During the reign of Diocletian, who began the practice of four simultaneous emperors (the Tetrarchy), the empire began to experience considerable change. On the Eastern border, the replacement of the Parthian rulers of Persia with the Sasanians resulted in the series of Roman–Sasanian Wars. Christianity, persecuted by Diocletian, was made legal by Constantine the Great with the Edict of Milan. This enabled the Christianization of the Roman Empire over the remainder of the fourth century. Theodosius I (d. 395) made Nicene Christianity the state church with the Edict of Thessalonica. Meanwhile, in the 5th century, Constantinople, became the new capital and superseded Rome as the largest city of the empire, as it also grew to become one of the largest in the world. By the 6th century, its population was ten times larger than that of Rome.

Beginning in the late fourth century, the Migration Period, which saw the movement and invasion of many large nomadic tribes (including the Germanic, Hunnic, and Slavic) into the Roman Empire, caused severe disruptions and led to the Sack of Rome by the Visigoths in 410 and subsequent Sack of Rome by the Vandals in 455. By 476, Western Roman Empire fell and was replaced by the so-called barbarian kingdoms. Rome itself was ruled by the Arian Ostrogothic Kingdom from Ravenna. The resultant cultural fusion of Greco-Roman, Germanic, and Christian traditions formed the foundations of the subsequent culture of Europe.

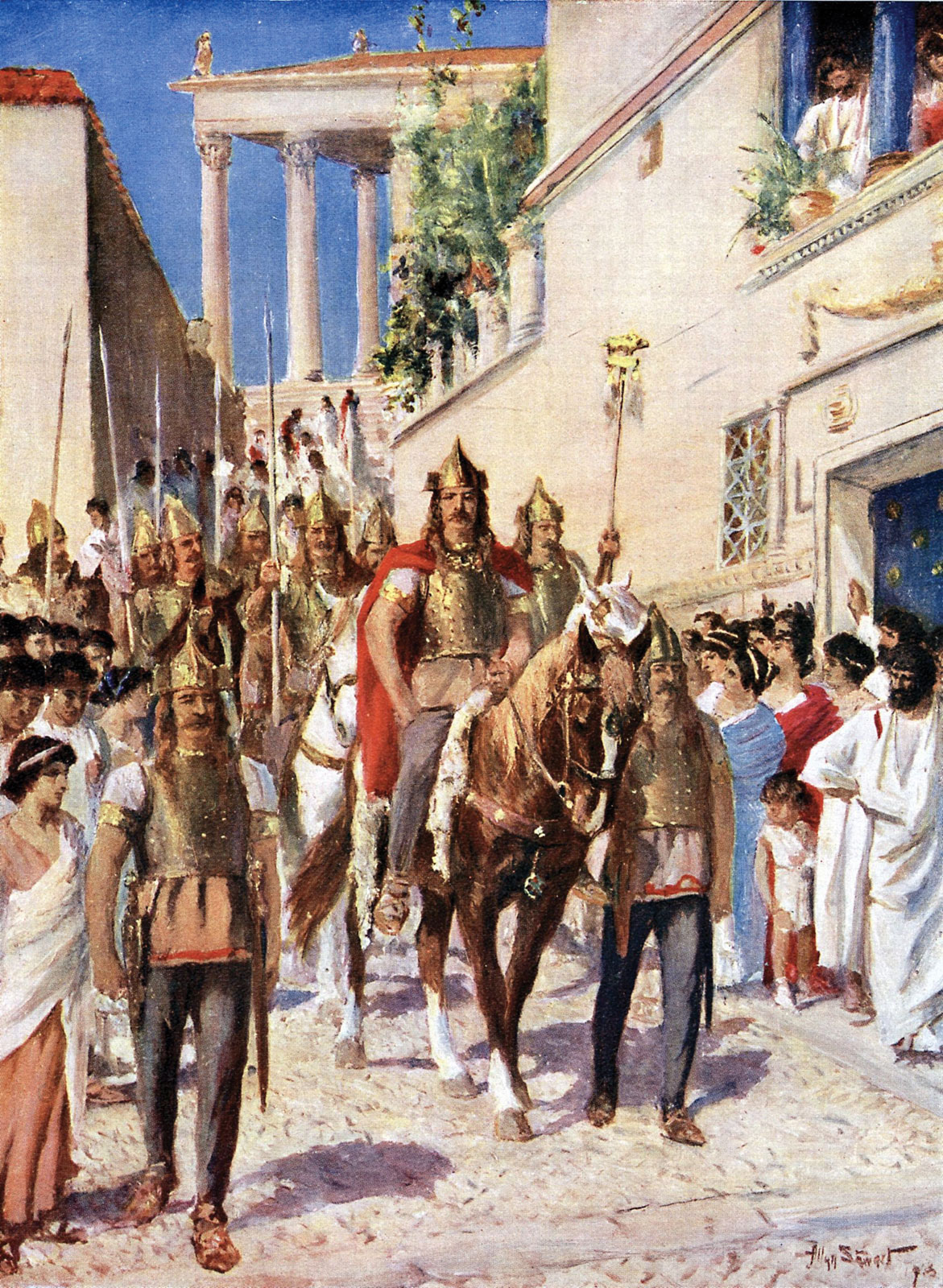
1915 illustration of Alaric I entering Athens

In the 6th century, Roman imperial rule continued in the East, and the Byzantine–Sasanian wars continued. The campaigns of Justinian the Great led to the fall of the Ostrogothic and Vandal Kingdoms and their reincorporation into the Empire, bringing the city of Rome and much of Italy and North Africa back under imperial control. Though most of Italy was soon lost to the Kingdom of the Lombards, the Roman Exarchate of Ravenna endured, ensuring the so-called Byzantine Papacy. Justinian constructed the Hagia Sophia, a great example of Byzantine architecture, as well as the Basilica Cistern, a massive underground cistern capable of holding up to 80,000 cubic metres of water, in addition to many other buildings constructed during his reign. Justinian also codified Roman law and brought silk production to Europe. At the same time, the first outbreak of the centuries-long first plague pandemic took place. At Ctesiphon, the Sasanians completed the Taq Kasra, the colossal iwan of which is the largest single-span vault of unreinforced brickwork in the world and the triumph of Sasanian architecture.

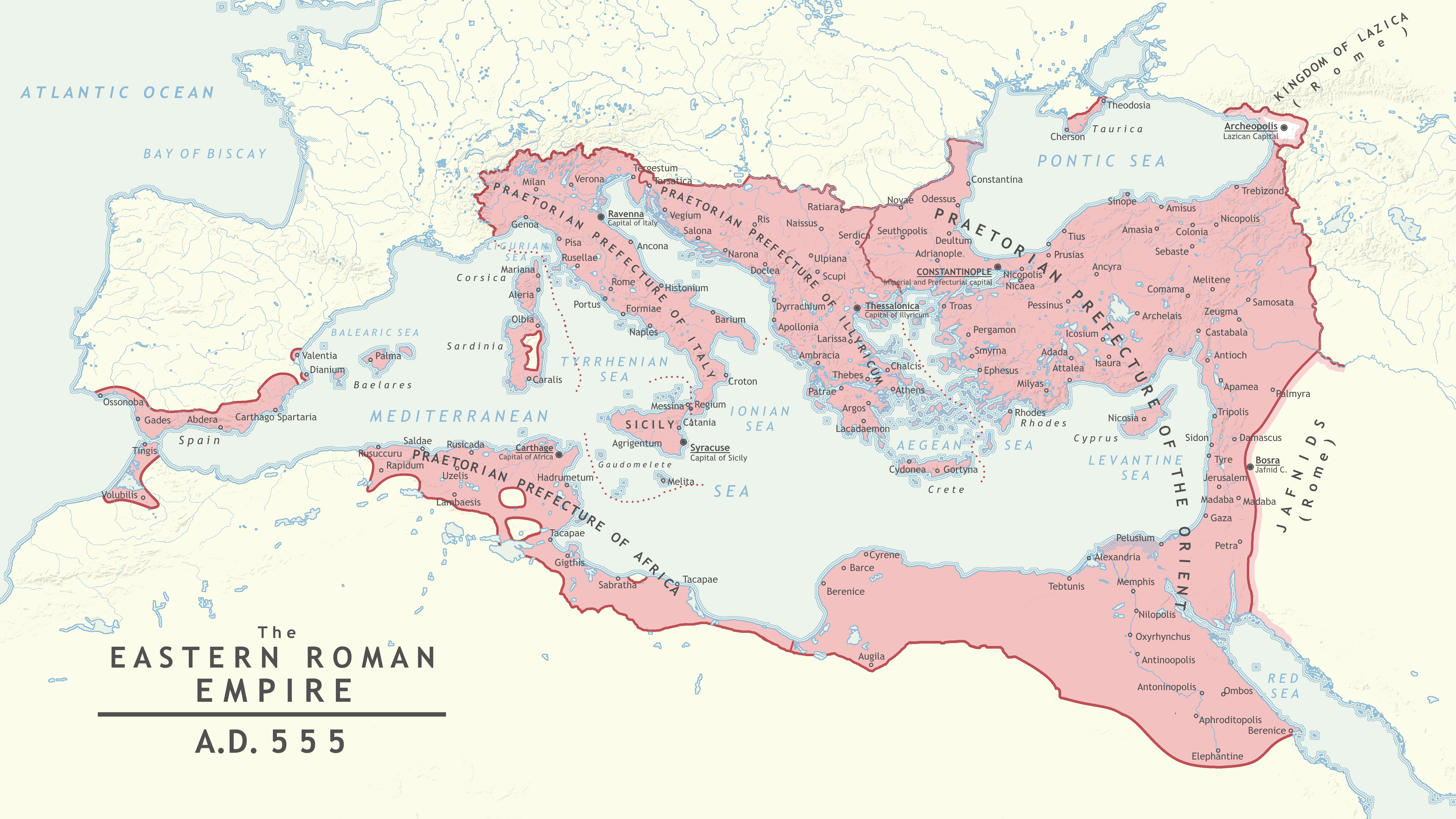
Byzantine Empire in 555 after Justinian's reconquests

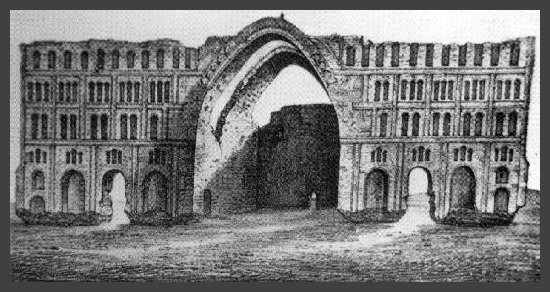
1824 drawing of the Taq Kasra

The middle of the 6th century was characterised by extreme climate events (the volcanic winter of 535–536 and the Late Antique Little Ice Age) and a disastrous pandemic (the Plague of Justinian in 541). The effects of these events in the social and political life are still under discussion. In the 7th century, the disastrous Byzantine–Sasanian War of 602–628 and the campaigns of Khosrow II and Heraclius facilitated the emergence of Islam in the Arabian Peninsula during the lifetime of Muhammad. The subsequent Muslim conquest of the Levant and Persia overthrew the Sasanian Empire and permanently wrested two thirds of the Eastern Roman Empire's territory from Roman control, forming the Rashidun Caliphate. The Byzantine Empire under the Heraclian dynasty began the middle Byzantine period, and together with the establishment of the later 7th century Umayyad Caliphate, along with the fall of the Exarchate of Ravenna to the Lombards in 750, which was seen as the last continuation of the West under "Roman" rule generally marks the end of late antiquity.

== Religion ==
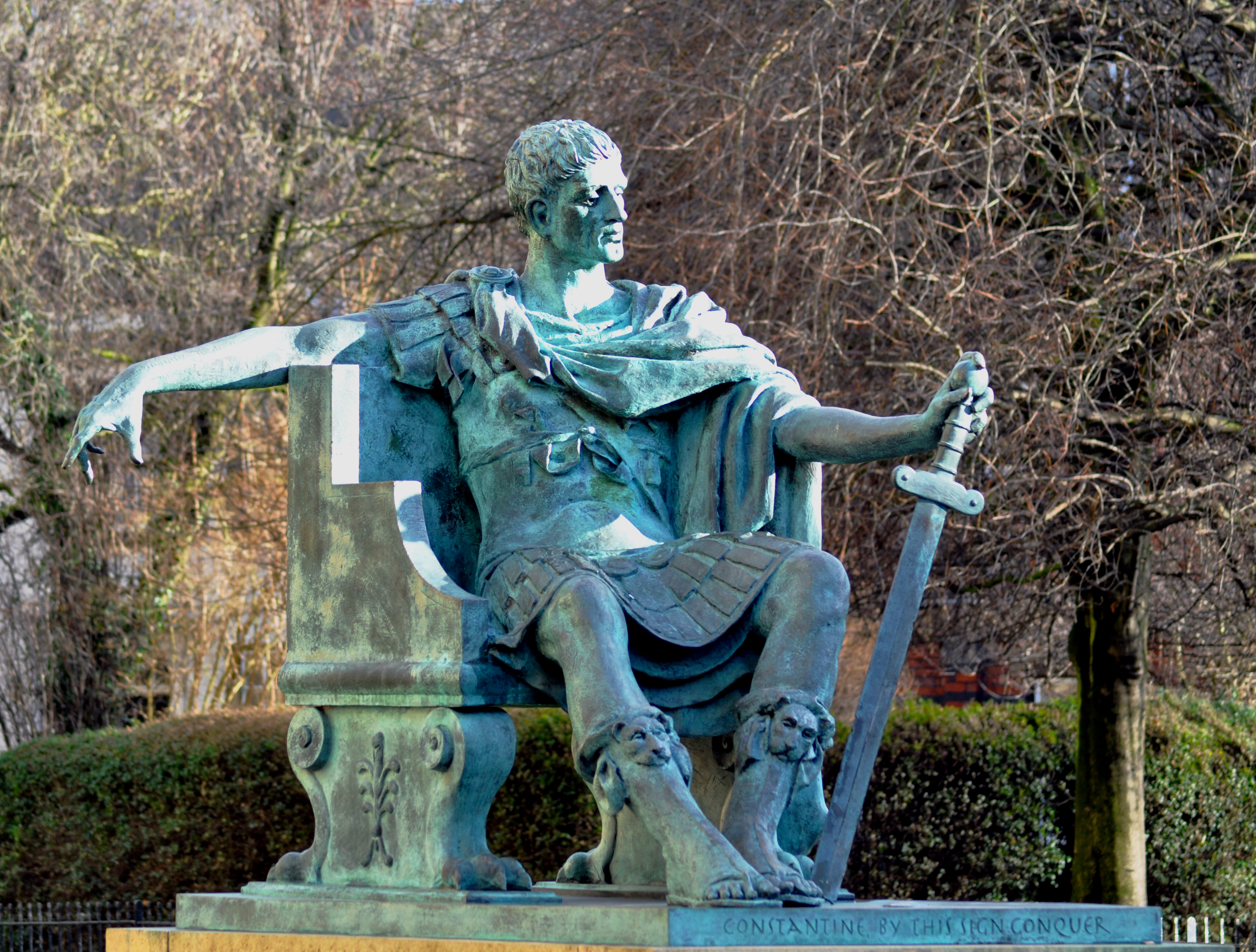
Modern statue of Constantine I at York, where he was proclaimed Augustus in 306.

One of the most important transformations in late antiquity was the formation and evolution of the Abrahamic religions: Christianity, Rabbinic Judaism and, eventually, Islam.

A milestone in the spread of Christianity was the conversion of Emperor Constantine the Great (r. 306–337) in 312, as claimed by his Christian panegyrist Eusebius of Caesarea, although the sincerity of his conversion is debated. Constantine confirmed the legalisation of the religion with the Edict of Milan in 313, which he jointly issued with his rival in the East, Licinius (r. 308–324). By the late 4th century, Emperor Theodosius I had made Christianity the state religion, a development which transformed the classical Roman world, characterised by Peter Brown as "rustling with the presence of many divine spirits."

Constantine was a key figure in many important events in Christian history, as he convened and attended the first ecumenical council of bishops at Nicaea in 325, subsidized the building of churches and sanctuaries such as the Church of the Holy Sepulchre in Jerusalem, and involved himself in questions such as the timing of Christ's resurrection and its relation to the Passover.

The birth of Christian monasticism in the 3rd century was a major step in the development of Christian spirituality. While it initially operated outside the episcopal authority of the Church, it would become hugely successful and by the 8th century it became one of the key Christian practices. Monasticism was not the only new Christian movement to appear in late antiquity, although it had perhaps the greatest influence and it achieved unprecedented geographical spread. It influenced many aspects of Christian religious life and led to a proliferation of various ascetic or semi-ascetic practices. Holy Fools and Stylites counted among the more extreme forms but through personalities like John Chrysostom, Jerome, Augustine or Gregory the Great monastic attitudes penetrated other areas of Christian life.

Late antiquity marks the decline of Roman state religion, circumscribed in degrees by edicts likely inspired by Christian advisors such as Eusebius to 4th century emperors, and a period of dynamic religious experimentation and spirituality with many syncretic sects, some formed centuries earlier, such as Gnosticism or Neoplatonism and the Chaldaean oracles, some novel, such as Hermeticism. Culminating in the reforms advocated by Apollonius of Tyana being adopted by Aurelian and formulated by Flavius Claudius Julianus to create an organised but short-lived pagan state religion that ensured its underground survival into the Byzantine age and beyond.

Mahāyāna Buddhism developed in India and along the Silk Road in Central Asia, while Manichaeism, a Dualist faith, arose in Mesopotamia and spread both East and West, for a time contending with Christianity in the Roman Empire.

Many of the new religions relied on the emergence of the parchment codex (bound book) over the papyrus volumen (scroll), the former allowing for quicker access to key materials and easier portability than the fragile scroll, thus fueling the rise of synoptic exegesis, papyrology. Notable in this regard is the topic of the Fifty Bibles of Constantine.

=== Laity vs. clergy ===
Within the recently legitimized Christian community of the 4th century, a division could be more distinctly seen between the laity and an increasingly celibate male leadership. These men presented themselves as removed from the traditional Roman motivations of public and private life marked by pride, ambition and kinship solidarity, and differing from the married pagan leadership. Unlike later strictures on priestly celibacy, celibacy in late antique Christianity sometimes took the form of abstinence from sexual relations after marriage, and it came to be the expected norm for urban clergy. Celibate and detached, the upper clergy became an elite equal in prestige to urban notables, the potentes or dynatoi.

=== The rise of Islam ===
The Byzantine Empire after the Arabs conquered the provinces of Syria and Egypt – the same time the early Slavs settled in the Balkans

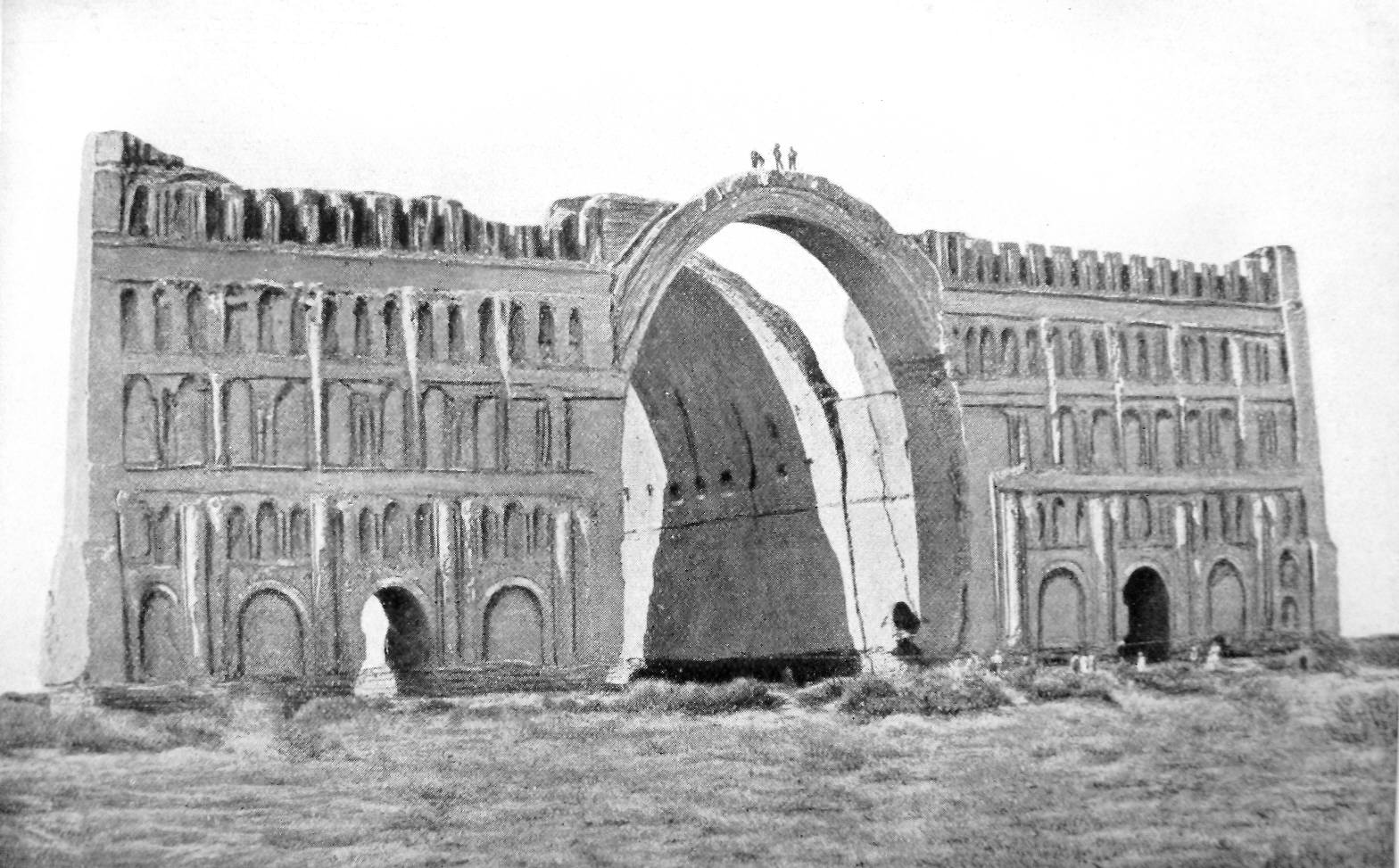
The ruins of the Taq Kasra in Ctesiphon, capital of the Sasanian Empire, photographed in 1864.

Islam appeared in the 7th century, spurring Arab armies to invade the Eastern Roman Empire and the Sassanian Empire of Persia, destroying the latter. After conquering all of North Africa and Visigothic Spain, the Islamic invasion was halted by Charles Martel at the Battle of Tours in modern France.

On the rise of Islam, two main theses prevail. On the one hand, there is the traditional view, as espoused by most historians prior to the second half of the twentieth century (and after) and by Muslim scholars. This view, the so-called "out of Arabia" thesis, holds that Islam as a phenomenon was a new, alien element in the late antique world. Related to this is the Pirenne Thesis, according to which the Arab invasions marked — through conquest and the disruption of Mediterranean trade routes — the cataclysmic end of late antiquity and the beginning of the Middle Ages.

On the other hand, there is a more recent thesis, associated with scholars in the tradition of Peter Brown, in which Islam is seen to be a product of the late antique world, not foreign to it. This school suggests that its origin within the shared cultural horizon of the late antique world explains the character of Islam and its development. Such historians point to similarities with other late antique religions and philosophies — especially Christianity — in the prominent role and manifestations of piety in Islam, in Islamic asceticism and the role of "holy persons", in the pattern of universalist, homogeneous monotheism tied to worldly and military power, in early Islamic engagement with Greek schools of thought, in the apocalypticism of Islamic theology and in the way the Quran seems to react to contemporary religious and cultural issues shared by the late antique world at large. Further indication that Arabia (and thus the environment in which Islam first developed) was a part of the late antique world is found in the close economic and military relations between Arabia, the Byzantine Empire and the Sassanian Empire. In recent years, the period of late antiquity has become a major focus in the fields of Quranic studies and Islamic origins.

== Cities ==
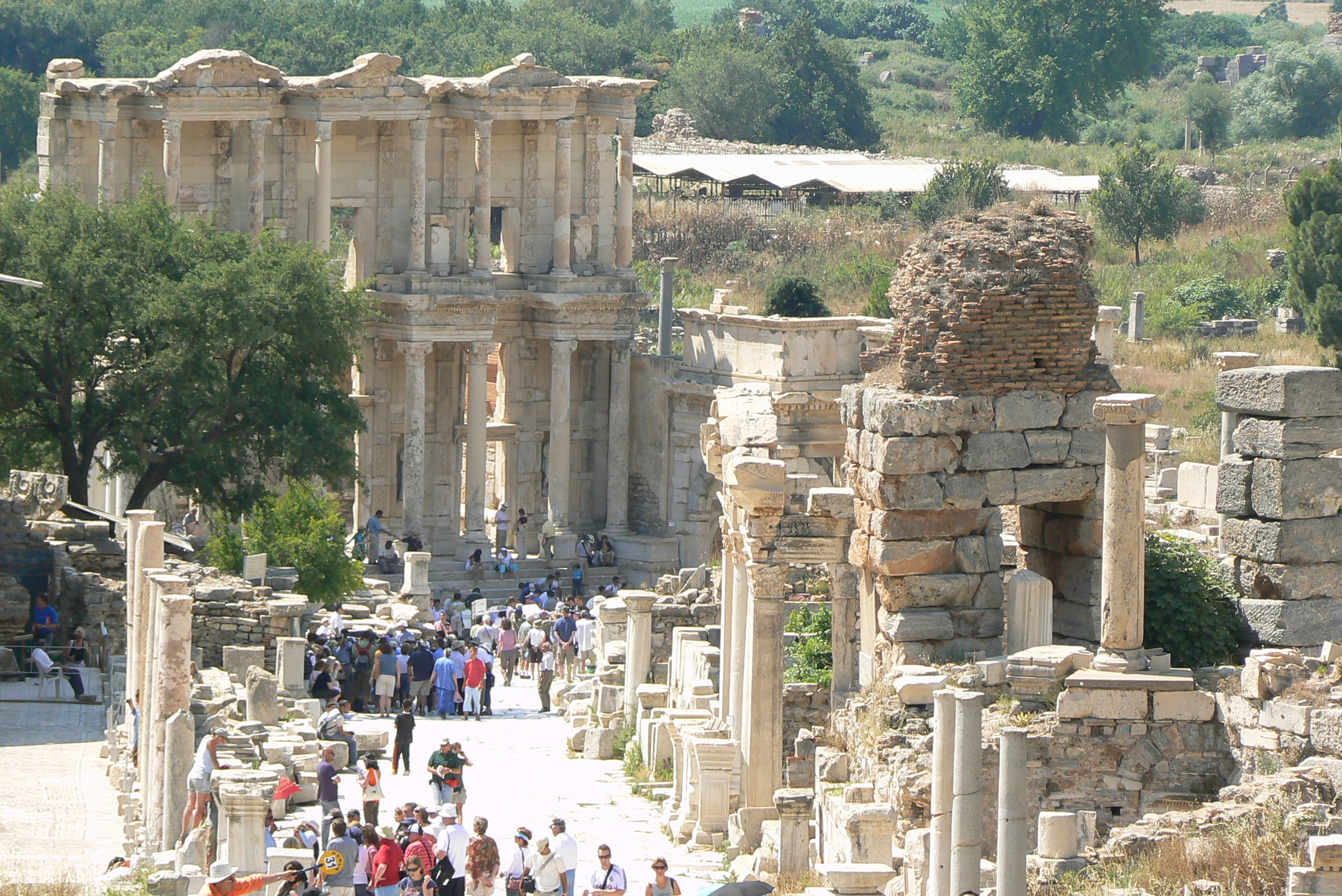
View west along the Harbour Street towards the Library of Celsus in Ephesus, present-day Turkey. The pillars on the left side of the street were part of the colonnaded walkway apparent in cities of late antique Asia Minor.

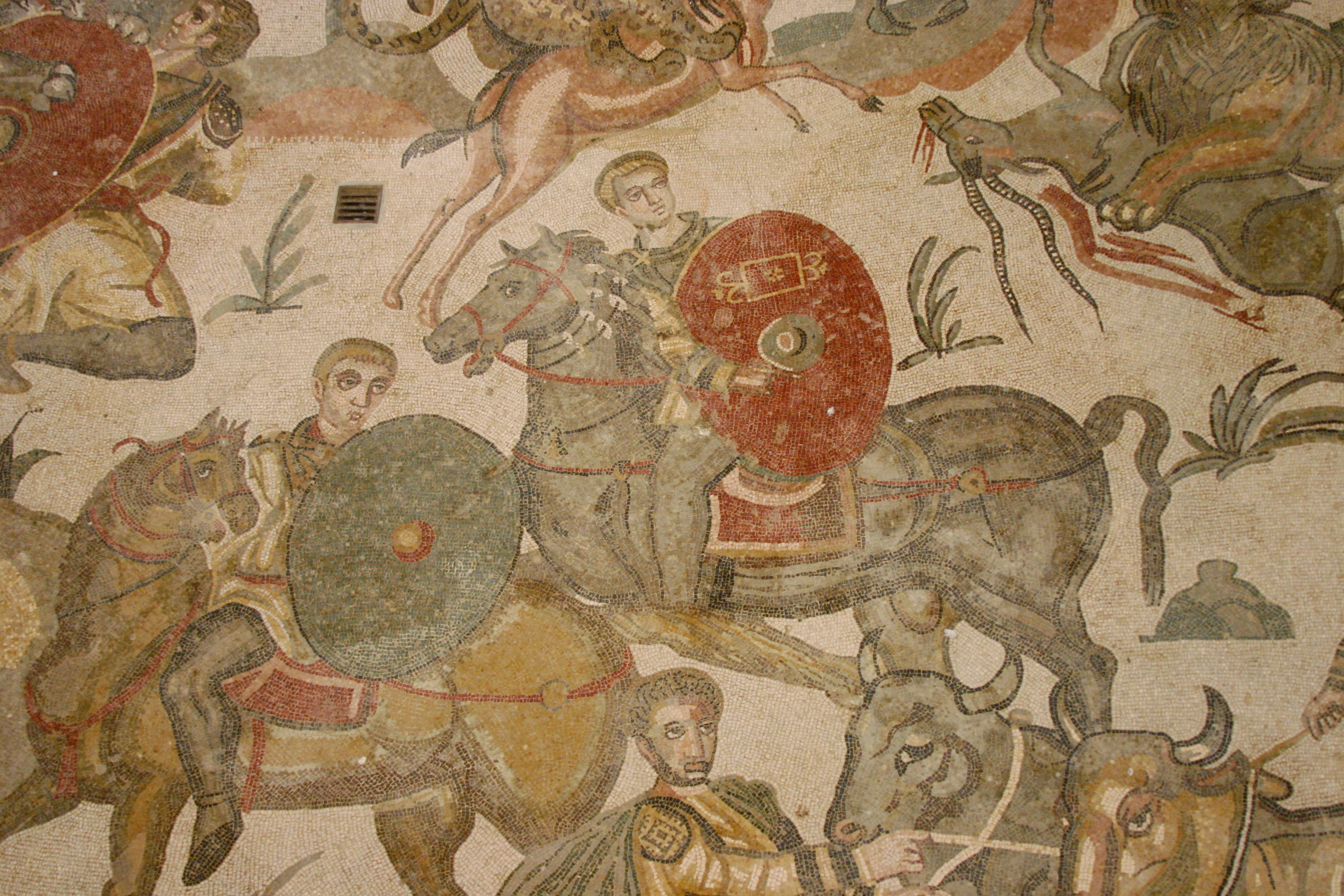
Roman cavalry from a mosaic of the Villa Romana del Casale, Sicily, 4th century CE

The later Roman Empire was in a sense a network of cities. Archaeology now supplements literary sources to document the transformation followed by the collapse of cities in the Mediterranean basin. Two diagnostic symptoms of decline — or as many historians prefer, "transformation" — are subdivision, particularly of expansive formal spaces in both the domus and the public basilica, and encroachment, in which artisans' shops invade the public thoroughfare, a transformation that was to result in the souk (marketplace). Burials within the urban precincts mark another stage in the dissolution of traditional urbanistic discipline, overpowered by the attraction of saintly shrines and relics. In Roman Britain, the typical 4th and 5th century layer of dark earth within cities seems to be a result of increased gardening in formerly urban spaces.

The city of Rome went from a population of 800,000 at the beginning of the period to a population of 30,000 by the end of the period, the most precipitous drop coming with the breaking of the aqueducts during the Gothic War. A similar though less marked decline in urban population occurred later in Constantinople, which was gaining population until the outbreak of the Plague of Justinian in 541. In Europe there was also a general decline in urban populations. As a whole, the period of late antiquity was accompanied by an overall population decline in almost all of Europe, and a reversion to more of a subsistence economy. Long-distance markets disappeared, and there was a reversion to a greater degree of local production and consumption, rather than webs of commerce and specialised production.

Concurrently, the continuity of the Eastern Roman Empire at Constantinople meant that the turning point for the Greek East came later, in the 7th century, as the Eastern Roman or Byzantine Empire centered around the Balkans, North Africa (Egypt and Carthage), and Asia Minor. The cities in the East were still lively stages for political participation and remained important for background for religious and political disputes. The degree and extent of discontinuity in the smaller cities of the Greek East is a moot subject among historians. The urban continuity of Constantinople is the outstanding example of the Mediterranean world; of the two great cities of lesser rank, Antioch was devastated by the Persian sack of 540, followed by the plague of Justinian (542 onwards) and completed by earthquake, while Alexandria survived its Islamic transformation, to suffer incremental decline in favour of Cairo in the medieval period.

Justinian rebuilt his birthplace in Illyricum, as a new city called Justiniana Prima. This became the metropolitan seat of the newly founded Archbishopric of Justiniana Prima. However, the city did not last for long: it was abandoned under a century later, in 615, potentially in response to the invading Avars.

R33 is a male archaeological sample from Late Antiquity Italy (circa 300–700 CE), specifically discovered at the Mausoleo di Augusto in Rome. Associated with the decline of Roman order, his genetic profile indicates mtDNA haplogroup K1a1* and Y-DNA haplogroup R-DF110, representing populations during the transition into early medieval European civilisation, according to dnagenics.

In mainland Greece, the inhabitants of Sparta, Argos and Corinth abandoned their cities for fortified sites in nearby high places; the fortified heights of Acrocorinth are typical of Byzantine urban sites in Greece. In Italy, populations that had clustered within reach of Roman roads began to withdraw from them, as potential avenues of intrusion, and to rebuild in typically constricted fashion round an isolated fortified promontory, or rocca; Cameron notes similar movement of populations in the Balkans, "where inhabited centres contracted and regrouped around a defensible acropolis, or were abandoned in favour of such positions elsewhere."

In the western Mediterranean, the only new cities known to be founded in Europe between the 5th and 8th centuries were the four or five Visigothic "victory cities". Reccopolis in the province of Guadalajara is one: the others were Victoriacum, founded by Leovigild, which may survive as the city of Vitoria, though a 12th century (re)foundation for this city is given in contemporary sources; Lugo id est Luceo in the Asturias, referred to by Isidore of Seville, and Ologicus (perhaps Ologitis), founded using Basque labour in 621 by Suinthila as a fortification against the Basques, modern Olite. All of these cities were founded for military purposes and at least Reccopolis, Victoriacum, and Ologicus in celebration of victory. A possible fifth Visigothic foundation is Baiyara (perhaps modern Montoro), mentioned as founded by Reccared in the 15th-century geographical account, Kitab al-Rawd al-Mitar. The arrival of a highly urbanised Islamic culture in the decade following 711 ensured the survival of cities in the Hispaniae into the Middle Ages.

Beyond the Mediterranean world, the cities of Gaul withdrew within a constricted line of defence around a citadel. Former imperial capitals such as Cologne and Trier lived on in diminished form as administrative centres of the Franks. In Britain, most towns and cities had been in decline, apart from a brief period of recovery during the fourth century, well before the withdrawal of Roman governors and garrisons, but the process might well have stretched well into the fifth century. Historians emphasizing urban continuities with the Anglo-Saxon period depend largely on the post-Roman survival of Roman toponymy. Aside from a mere handful of its continuously inhabited sites, like York and London and possibly Canterbury, however, the rapidity and thoroughness with which its urban life collapsed with the dissolution of centralized bureaucracy calls into question the extent to which Roman Britain had ever become authentically urbanized: "in Roman Britain towns appeared a shade exotic," observes H. R. Loyn, "owing their reason for being more to the military and administrative needs of Rome than to any economic virtue". The other institutional power centre, the Roman villa, did not survive in Britain either. Gildas lamented the destruction of the twenty-eight cities of Britain; though not all in his list can be identified with known Roman sites, Loyn finds no reason to doubt the essential truth of his statement.

Classical antiquity can generally be defined as an age of cities; the Greek polis and Roman municipium were locally organised, self-governing bodies of citizens governed by written constitutions. When Rome came to dominate the known world, local initiative and control were gradually subsumed by the ever-growing Imperial bureaucracy; by the Crisis of the Third Century the military, political and economic demands made by the Empire made the service in local government to be an onerous duty, often imposed as punishment. Harassed urban dwellers fled to the walled estates of the wealthy to avoid taxes, military service, famine and disease. In the Western Roman Empire especially, many cities destroyed by invasion or civil war in the 3rd century could not be rebuilt. Plague and famine hit the urban class in greater proportion, and thus the people who knew how to keep civic services running. Perhaps the greatest blow came in the wake of the extreme weather events of 535–536 and subsequent Plague of Justinian, when the remaining trade networks ensured the Plague spread to the remaining commercial cities. The impact of this outbreak of plague has recently been disputed. The end of classical antiquity is the end of the polis model. While there was a decline of urban life in late antiquity (especially in the West) the epoch brought with it new forms of political participation in the urban spaces as well. Especially the role of crowds and masses in cities increased, leading to new levels of tension.

Column of Arcadius, Constantinople (built 401–421)
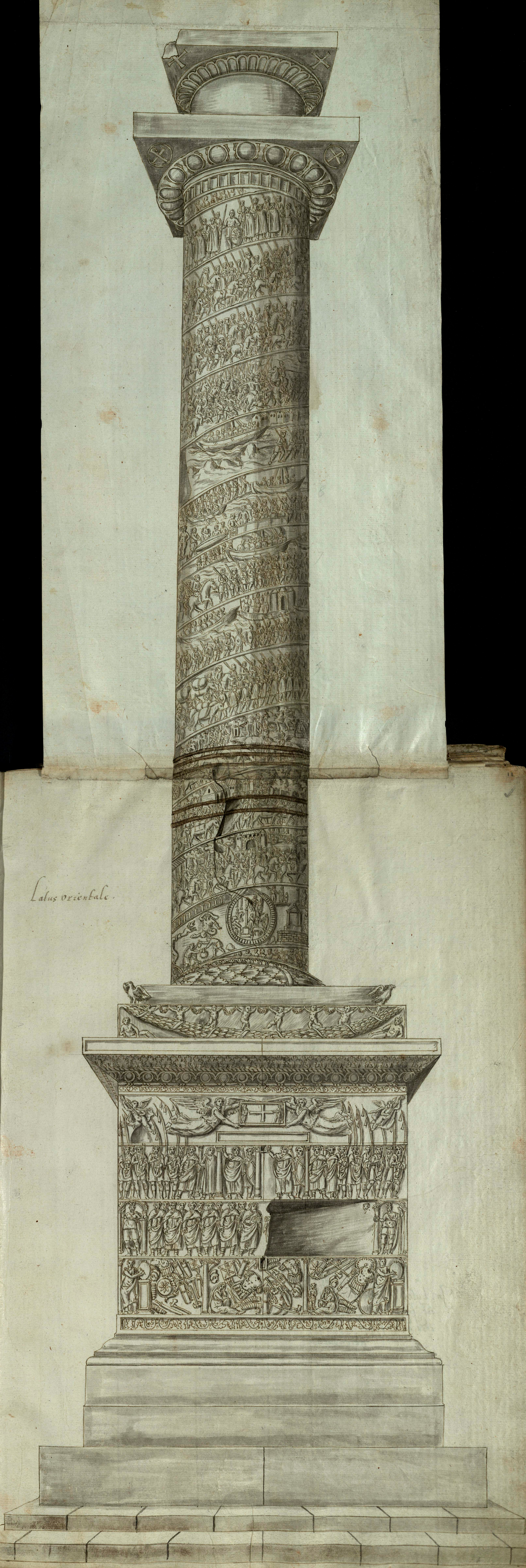
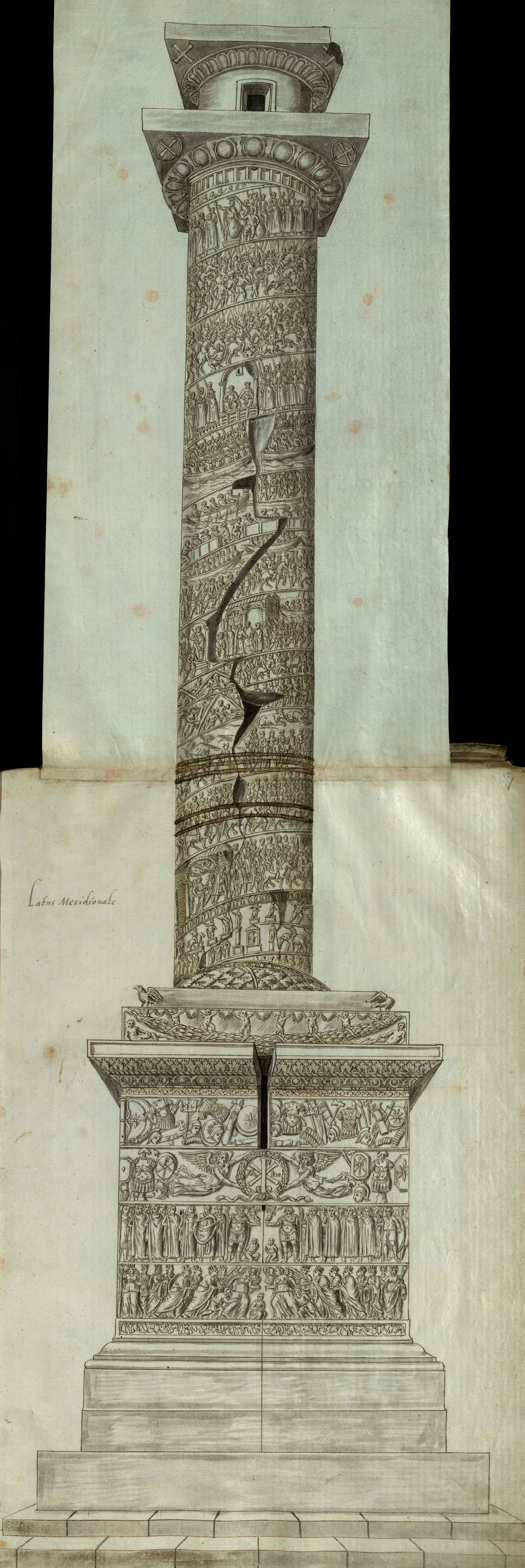
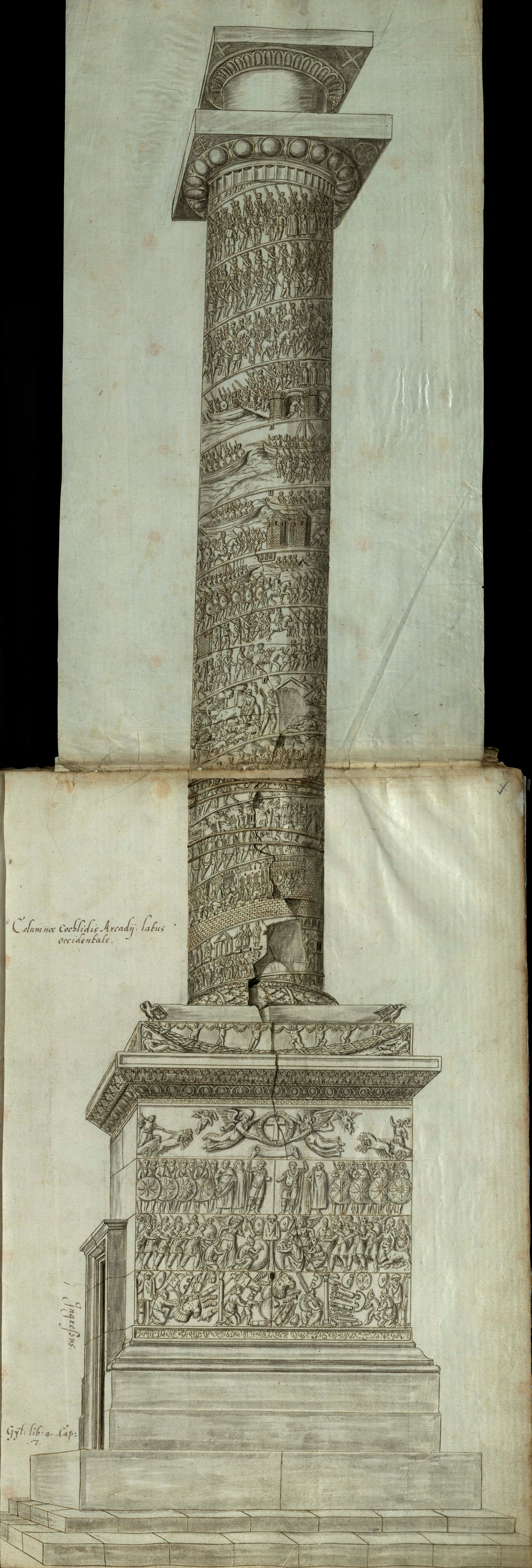
Library of Trinity College, Cambridge: ms. O.17.2 (the "Freshfield album"), folios 11–13

=== Public building ===
In the fourth century, the basilica emerged as one of the most important civic structures. As cities faced growing financial strain, municipal expenditures prioritized the maintenance of defensive walls, baths, and bazaars, while fewer resources went toward more luxury public amenities such as amphitheaters, theaters, libraries, and lecture halls. With the rise of Christianity, the basilica and other sacred architecture (such as churches and charitable institutions) came to occupy a growing share of the public space. The Christian basilica was inspired by Roman, civic predecessors, including features such as the long nave, side aisles, and especially the apse. In its Christian form, the chair of the apse was taken by the bishop, echoing the tribunal of the magistrate in the earlier secular form of the institution, and symbolically reimagining the bishop as the spiritual ruler in Christ's place. Famous, great basilica from this time period included the Archbasilica of Saint John Lateran as well as the St. Peter's Basilica, both located in Rome, and the Basilica of San Vitale in Ravenna. Great examples of architecture from this time period, other than basilica, included the Hagia Sophia, erected by the Byzantine emperor Justinian I in the sixth century.

City life in the East, though negatively affected by the plague in the 6th–7th centuries, finally collapsed due to Slavic invasions in the Balkans and Persian destructions in Anatolia in the 620s. City life continued in Syria, Jordan and Palestine into the 8th. In the late 6th century, street construction was still undertaken in Caesarea Maritima in Palestine, and Edessa was able to deflect Chosroes I with massive payments in gold in 540 and 544, before it was overrun in 609.

== Sculpture and art ==
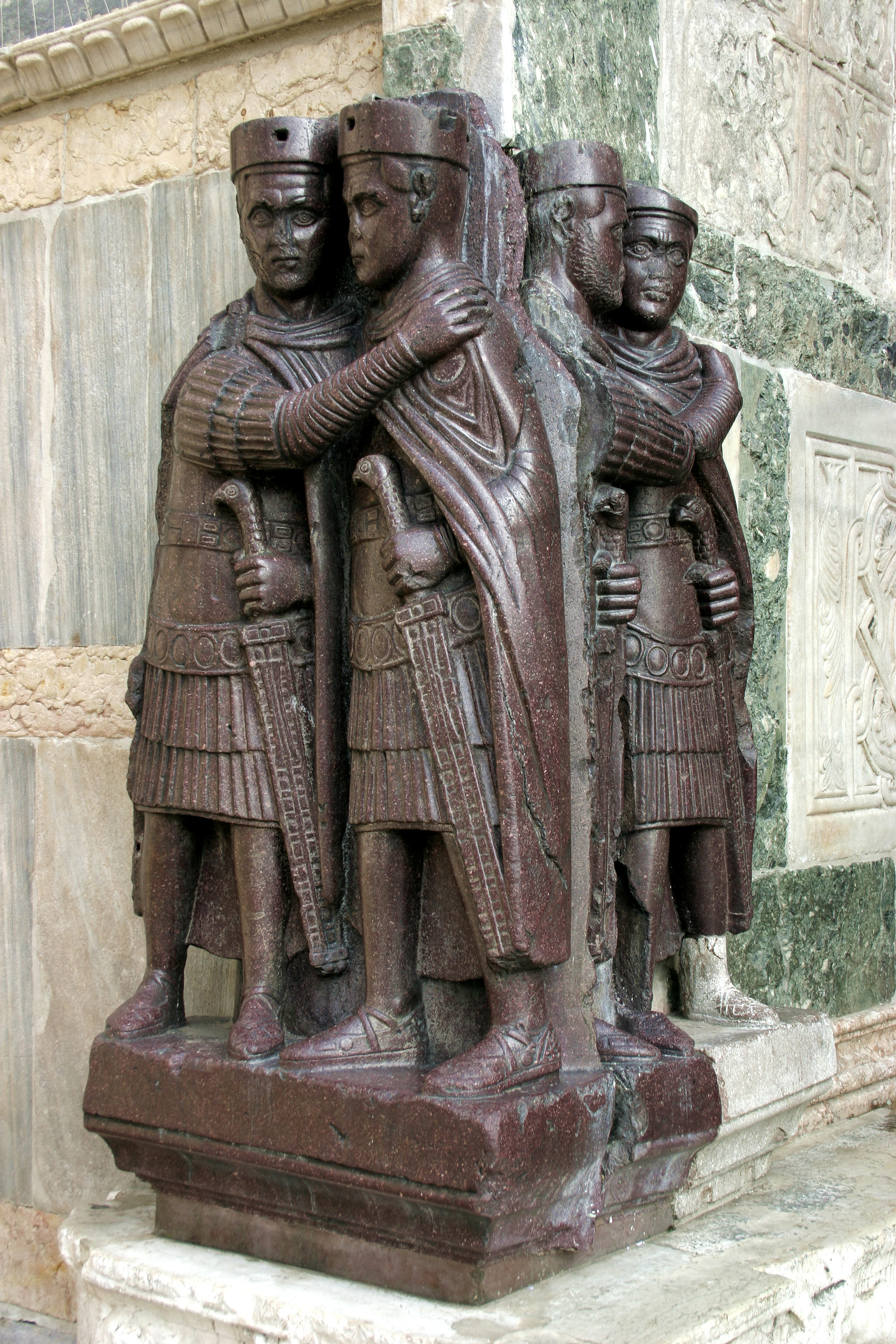
The Four Tetrarchs, in porphyry, later sacked from Constantinople, St. Marks, Venice

The stylistic changes characteristic of late-antique art mark the end of classical Roman art and the beginnings of medieval art. As a complicated period bridging Roman art and later medieval styles (such as that of the Byzantines), the late-antique period saw a transition from the classical idealised realism tradition (largely influenced by ancient Greek art) to the more iconic, stylised art of the Middle Ages. Unlike classical art, late-antique art does not emphasise the beauty and movement of the body, but rather hints at a spiritual reality behind its subjects. Additionally, mirroring the rise of Christianity and the collapse of the Western Roman Empire, painting and freestanding sculpture gradually fell from favour in the commissioning/artistic community. Replacing them were greater interests in mosaics, architecture, and relief sculpture.

As the soldier-emperors such as Maximinus Thrax (r. 235–238) emerged from the provinces in the 3rd century, they introduced their own regional influences and artistic tastes. For example, artists jettisoned the classical portrayal of the human body for one that was more rigid and frontal. This is markedly evident in the combined porphyry Portrait of the Four Tetrarchs (c. 300), now in Venice. With these stubby figures clutching each other and their swords, all individualism, naturalism, Roman verism, and Greek idealism diminish. The Arch of Constantine (constructed between 312 and 315) in Rome, which re-used earlier classicising reliefs together with ones in the new style, shows the contrast especially clearly. In nearly all artistic media, simpler shapes were adopted, and once-natural designs were abstracted. Additionally, hierarchy of scale overtook the preeminence of perspective and other classical models for representing spatial organisation.

From c. 300 Early Christian art began to create new public forms, which now included sculpture (previously distrusted by Christians as it was so important in pagan worship). Sarcophagi carved in relief had already become highly elaborate, and Christian versions adopted new styles, showing a series of different tightly-packed scenes rather than one overall image (usually derived from Greek history-painting) as was the norm. Soon the scenes were split into two registers, as in the Dogmatic Sarcophagus (320 to 350) or the Sarcophagus of Junius Bassus of c. 359 (the last of these exemplifying a partial revival of classicism).

Nearly all of these more abstracted conventions could be observed in the glittering mosaics of the era, which during this period moved from being decoration—derivative from painting—used on floors (and walls likely to become wet) to become a major vehicle of religious art in churches. The glazed surfaces of the tesserae sparkled in the light and illuminated the basilica churches. Unlike with their fresco predecessors, much more emphasis was placed on demonstrating a symbolic fact rather than on rendering a realistic scene. As time progressed during the late antique period, art became more concerned with biblical themes and influenced by interactions of Christianity with the Roman state. Within this Christian subcategory of Roman art, dramatic changes were taking place in the depiction of Jesus. Jesus Christ had been more commonly portrayed as an itinerant philosopher, as a teacher or as the "Good Shepherd", resembling the traditional iconography of Hermes. He was increasingly given Roman élite status, and shrouded in purple robes like the emperors, with orb and sceptre in hand — this new type of depiction is variously thought to be derived either from the iconography of Jupiter or from that of classical philosophers.

As for luxury arts, manuscript illumination on vellum and parchment emerged from the 5th century, with a few manuscripts of Roman literary classics like the Vergilius Vaticanus and the Vergilius Romanus, but increasingly with Christian texts, of which the Quedlinburg Itala fragment (420–430) is the oldest survivor. Carved ivory diptychs were used for secular subjects, as in the imperial and consular diptychs presented to friends, as well as for religious ones, both Christian and pagan—they seem to have been especially a vehicle for the last group of powerful pagans to resist Christianity, as in the late-4th-century Symmachi–Nicomachi diptych. Extravagant hoards of silver plate are especially common from the 4th century, including the Mildenhall Treasure, Esquiline Treasure, Hoxne Hoard, and the imperial Missorium of Theodosius I. Jewelry of the period sometimes incorporated older engraved gems.

== Literature ==
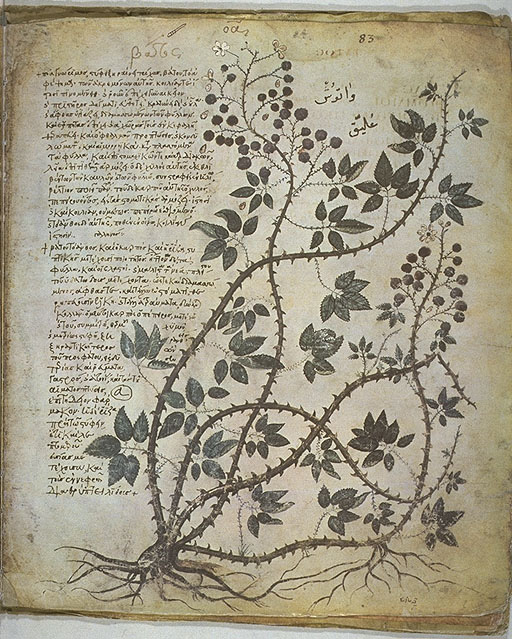
The Vienna Dioscurides, an early 6th century illuminated manuscript of De Materia Medica by Dioscorides in Greek, a rare example of a late antique scientific text

In the field of literature, late antiquity is known for the declining use of classical Greek and Latin, and the rise of literary cultures in Syriac, Armenian, Georgian, Ethiopic, Arabic, and Coptic. It also marks a shift in literary style, with a preference for encyclopedic works in a dense and allusive style, consisting of summaries of earlier works (anthologies, epitomes) often dressed up in elaborate allegorical garb (e.g., De nuptiis Mercurii et Philologiae [The Marriage of Mercury and Philology] of Martianus Capella and the De arithmetica, De musica, and De consolatione philosophiae of Boethius—both later key works in medieval education). The 4th and 5th centuries also saw an explosion of Christian literature, of which Greek writers such as Eusebius of Caesarea, Basil of Caesarea, Gregory of Nazianzus and John Chrysostom and Latin writers such as Ambrose of Milan, Jerome and Augustine of Hippo are only among the most renowned representatives. On the other hand, authors such as Ammianus Marcellinus (4th century) and Procopius of Caesarea (6th century) were able to keep the tradition of classical Hellenistic historiography alive in the Byzantine empire. Due to several factors of the era, among them the political instability and the constant military threats, treatises on war became a popular genre with the Byzantine military manuals achieving great renown and influence; the most famous of which is the Strategikon attributed to Emperor Maurice, written in the 6th century.

One genre of literature among Christian writers in this period was the Hexaemeron, dedicated to the composition of commentaries, homilies, and treatises concerned with the exegesis of the Genesis creation narrative. The first example of this was the Hexaemeron of Basil of Caesarea, with the first occurrence in Syriac literature being the Hexaemeron of Jacob of Serugh.

== See also ==
- Henri Pirenne
- Fall of the Western Roman Empire
- Church of the priest Félix and baptistry of Kélibia
- Low Roman Empire
- Baptistery of Bekalta

== Bibliography ==
- Perry Anderson, Passages from Antiquity to Feudalism, NLB, London, 1974.
- Peter Brown, The World of Late Antiquity: from Marcus Aurelius to Muhammad (CE 150–750), Thames and Hudson, 1989 ISBN 0-393-95803-5
- Peter Brown, Authority and the Sacred: Aspects of the Christianisation of the Roman World, Routledge, 1997 ISBN 0-521-59557-6
- Peter Brown, The Rise of Western Christendom: Triumph and Diversity 200–1000 CE, Blackwell, 2003 ISBN 0-631-22138-7
- Henning Börm, Westrom. Von Honorius bis Justinian, 2nd ed., Kohlhammer Verlag, 2018 ISBN 978-3-17-023276-1. (Review in English).
- Averil Cameron, The Later Roman Empire: CE 284–430, Harvard University Press, 1993 ISBN 0-674-51194-8
- Averil Cameron, The Mediterranean World in Late Antiquity CE 395–700, Routledge, 2011 ISBN 0-415-01421-2
- Averil Cameron et al. (editors), The Cambridge Ancient History, vols. 12–14, Cambridge University Press 1997ff.
- Gilian Clark, Late Antiquity: A Very Short Introduction, Oxford University Press, 2011 ISBN 978-0-19-954620-6
- John Curran, Pagan City and Christian Capital: Rome in the Fourth Century, Clarendon Press, 2000
- Ken Dark, Civitas to Kingdom. Leicester University Press, 1994
- Dark, Ken (2000). Britain and the End of the Roman Empire. Stroud, UK: Tempus Publishing. ISBN 978-0-7524-2532-0.
- Alexander Demandt, Die Spätantike, 2nd ed., Beck, 2007
- Peter Dinzelbacher and Werner Heinz, Europa in der Spätantike, Primus, 2007.
- Mateusz Fafinski and Jakob Riemenschneider. Monasticism and the City in Late Antiquity and the Early Middle Ages. Elements in Late Antique Religion 2. Cambridge University Press, 2023.
- Gasper, Giles (2024). "On the Six Days of Creation: The Hexaemeral Tradition". In Goroncy, Jason (ed.). T&T Clark Handbook of the Doctrine of Creation. Bloomsbury Publishing. pp. 176–190.
- Fabio Gasti, Profilo storico della letteratura tardolatina, Pavia University Press, 2013 ISBN 978-88-96764-09-1.
- Tomas Hägg (ed.) "SO Debate: The World of Late Antiquity revisited," in Symbolae Osloenses (72), 1997.
- Herrin, Judith (2020). Ravenna: Capital of Empire, Crucible of Europe. Princeton, New Jersey: Princeton University Press. ISBN 978-0-691-20422-2.
- Scott F. Johnson ed., The Oxford Handbook of Late Antiquity, Oxford University Press, 2012, ISBN 978-0-19-533693-1
- Arnold H.M. Jones, The Later Roman Empire, 284–602; a social, economic and administrative survey, vols. I, II, University of Oklahoma Press, 1964.
- Kitzinger, Ernst (1977). Byzantine art in the making: main lines of stylistic development in Mediterranean art, 3rd–7th century. Faber & Faber. ISBN 0-571-11154-8.
- Bertrand Lançon, Rome in Late Antiquity: CE 313–604, Routledge, 2001.
- Noel Lenski (ed.), The Cambridge Companion to the Age of Constantine, Cambridge University Press, 2006.
- Samuel N.C. Lieu and Dominic Montserrat (eds.), From Constantine to Julian: Pagan and Byzantine Views, A Source History, Routledge, 1996.
- Josef Lössl and Nicholas J. Baker-Brian (eds.), A Companion to Religion in Late Antiquity, Wiley Blackwell, 2018.
- McGill, Scott; Watts, Edward J. (2018). "Introduction". In McGill, Scott; Watts, Edward (eds.). A Companion to Late Antique Literature. Wiley-Blackwell. pp. 3–8.
- Michael Maas (ed.), The Cambridge Companion to the Age of Justinian, Cambridge University Press, 2005.
- Michael Maas (ed.), The Cambridge Companion to the Age of Attila, Cambridge University Press, 2015.
- Robert Markus, The end of Ancient Christianity, Cambridge University Press, 1990.
- Ramsay MacMullen, Christianizing the Roman Empire C.E. 100–400, Yale University Press, 1984.
- Stephen Mitchell, A History of the Later Roman Empire. CE 284–641, 2nd ed., Blackwell, 2015.
- Michael Rostovtzeff (rev. P. Fraser), The Social and Economic History of the Roman Empire, Oxford University Press, 1979.
- Johannes Wienand (ed.), Contested Monarchy. Integrating the Roman Empire in the Fourth Century CE, Oxford University Press, 2015.
