= Patricia Fortini Brown =

American professor and historian (born 1936)

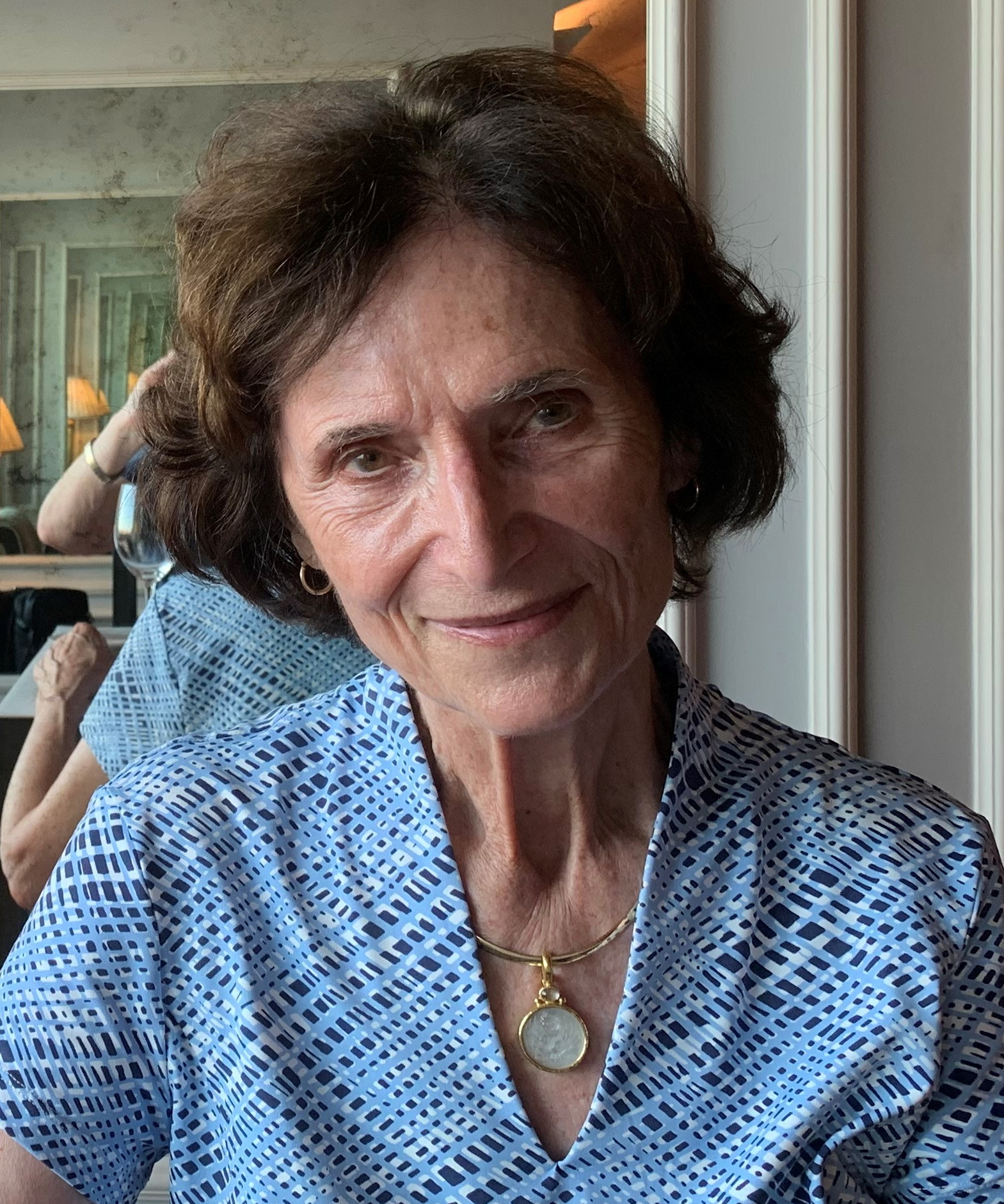
- Brown in 2019
- Born: Patricia Ann Fortini; November 16, 1936 (age 89); Oakland, California, U.S.
- Occupations: Art historian; professor
- Children: 2

Academic background
- Education: University of California, Berkeley (BA), (MA), (PhD)

Academic work
- Discipline: Italian Renaissance art
- Sub-discipline: Art and history of Venice
- Institutions: Princeton University

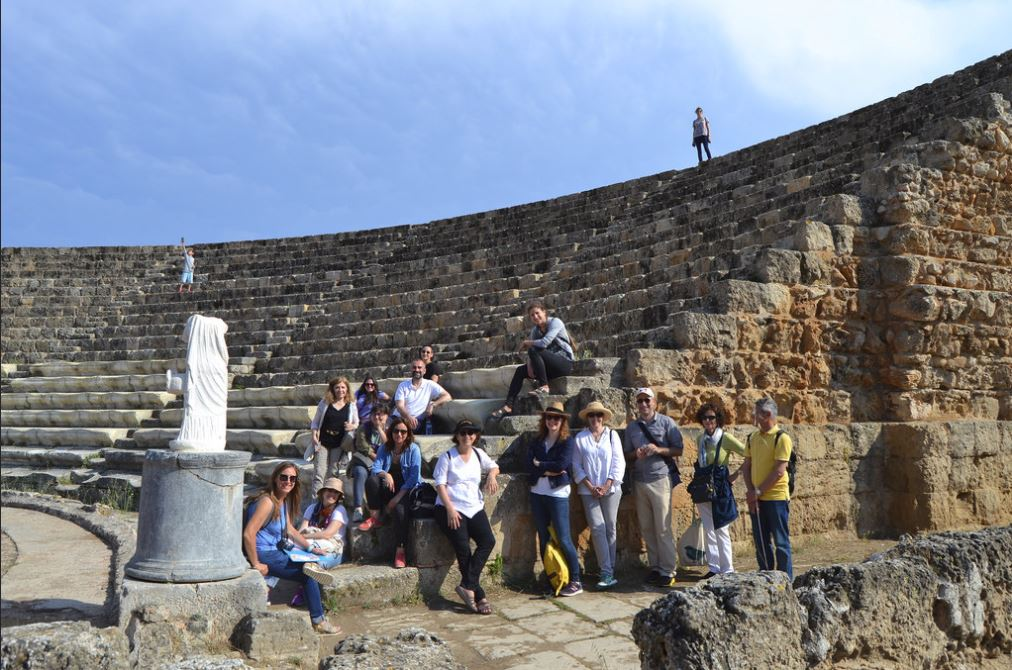
MCities group at Salamis, Northern Cyprus

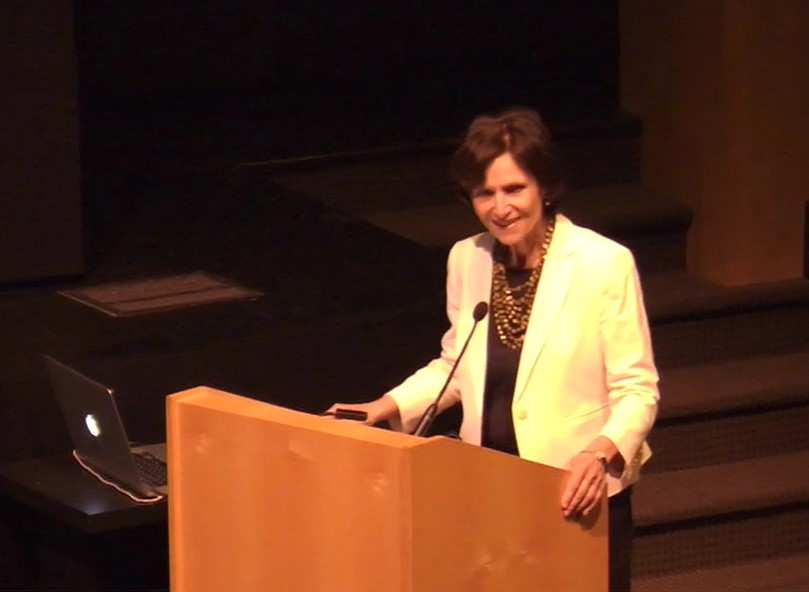
Lecture at Norton Simon Museum in 2018

Patricia Fortini Brown (born 16 November 1936) is Professor Emerita of Art & Archaeology at Princeton University.

Venice and its empire, from the late Middle Ages through the early modern period, have been the primary site of her scholarly research, with a focus on how works of art and architecture can materialize and sum up significant aspects of the culture in which they were produced. Her recent work has focused on Venetian territories in the Mediterranean and the Terraferma, particularly the Friuli.

== Early life and education ==
Brown was born and raised in Oakland, California, where she graduated from Fremont High School in 1954. After attending Brigham Young University, she graduated from the University of California, Berkeley, with an A.B. in Political Science (1959). Brown was active as a studio artist for 17 years and raised two sons before beginning graduate work. Returning to Berkeley in 1976, she earned an M.A. (1978) and PhD (1983) in the History of Art. Brown taught at Princeton for 27 years (1983–2010), where she was the first woman to be promoted to tenure (1989) in the Department of Art & Archaeology and served as department chair for six years (1999–2005).

== Career ==
Brown was Slade Professor of Fine Arts at the University of Cambridge (2000–2001). She served as president of the Renaissance Society of America (2000–2002), and was a member of the Board of Advisors for the Center for Advanced Study in the Visual Arts (2004–2007). She serves on an Advisory committee for “Mediterranean Palimpsests: Connecting the Art and Architectural Histories of Medieval and Early Modern Cities," a Getty-funded research project (with research trips with the MCities group to Nicosia, Cordoba, Granada, Rhodes, and Thessaloniki), 2018–20, and has been a member of the Board of Trustees of Save Venice since 2004.

In recognition of her retirement in 2010, Brown was honored with eight sessions at the annual meeting of the Renaissance Society of America in Venice, as well as with a symposium at Princeton University: "Giorgione and His Times: Confronting Alternate Realities" on the 500th anniversary of the death of Giorgione. Selected papers from the two symposia were published in a Festschrift edited by Blake de Maria and Mary E. Frank, Reflections on Renaissance Venice: a celebration of Patricia Fortini Brown (Milan: 5 Continents Editions; New York: Harry N. Abrams, 2013) (Winner of the Gladys Krieble Delmas Foundation Book Prize in 2015 from the Renaissance Society of America).

== Honors and awards ==
- 1980: Social Science Research Council and American Council of Learned Societies International Doctoral Research Fellowship
- 1980: Fulbright-Hays Grant for dissertation research in Italy
- 1982, 1998: Gladys Krieble Delmas Foundation Grants for Research in Venice
- 1989: Rome Prize Fellowship, American Academy in Rome
- 1989: John Simon Guggenheim Fellowship
- 1991–1995: Andrew W. Mellon Professorship, Princeton University
- 1992: Museo Italo Americano, San Francisco, Italian American Woman of the Year for scholarship in Italian Studies
- 1998: Folger Shakespeare Library, Mellon Postdoctoral Research Fellowship
- 2010: Ateneo Veneto di Scienze, Lettere ed Arti, elected Socio Straniero (Corresponding Fellow)
- 2010: Stephen E. Ostrow Distinguished Visitor in the Visual Arts, Reed College
- 2011: Serena Medal, awarded annually by the British Academy for ‘eminent services towards the furtherance of the study of Italian history, literature, art and economics’
- 2014: Edward J. Olszewski Lecture in Italian Art, Case Western Reserve University
- 2016: Sydney Freedberg Lecture in Italian Art, National Gallery of Art, Washington, DC
- 2020: Renaissance Society of America, Paul Oscar Kristeller Lifetime Achievement Award

== Selected publications ==
- Venetian Narrative Painting in the Age of Carpaccio. New Haven: Yale University Press. 1988. ISBN 978-0-300-04743-1. (Finalist, Premio "Salotto Veneto 89", for the best book published on Venetian culture)
- "Le scuole". In: Italian Enciclopedia Treccani, Storia di Venezia, vol. 5, Rome 1996 (in Italian, translated by Luisa Contarello).
- Venice & Antiquity: The Venetian Sense of the Past. New Haven: Yale University Press. 1996. ISBN 978-0-300-06700-2. (Winner of the Phyllis Goodhart Gordan Book Prize; (Finalist, Charles Rufus Morey Prize, College Art Association)
- The Renaissance in Venice. London: Weidenfeld & Nicolson. 1997. ISBN 0-297-83613-7.
- Art and Life in Renaissance Venice. New York: Prentice Hall. 2005. ISBN 978-0-13-134402-0. (with French, German, Korean, Chinese, Spanish translations)
- Private Lives in Renaissance Venice: Art, Architecture, and the Family. New Haven: Yale University Press. 2004. ISBN 978-0-300-10236-9. (Finalist, Charles Rufus Morey Prize, College Art Association; Honorable Mention, Premio Salimbeni per La Storia e la Critica d’Arte)
- Matino, Gabriele; Brown, Patricia Fortini (2020). Carpaccio in Venice. A Guide. Venice: Marsilio Editori. ISBN 978-88-297-0781-2. (Italian edition: Carpaccio a Venezia: Itinerari. ISBN 978-88-297-0772-0.)
- The Venetian Bride: Bloodlines and Blood Feuds in Venice and Its Empire. Oxford: Oxford University Press. 2021. ISBN 9780192894571.
