= Alexander Brown =

Alexander Brown may refer to:

== Sports ==
- Alexander Brown (cricketer) (born 1967), English cricketer
- Alec Brown (snooker player) (Alexander Edward Brown, 1908–1995), English snooker player
- Sandy Brown (footballer, born 1877) (Alexander Brown, 1877–1944), Scottish footballer
- Sandy Brown (footballer, born 1939) (Alexander Dewar Brown, 1939–2014), Scottish footballer
- Sandy Brown (cricketer) (Alexander Brown, born 1950), Scottish cricketer

== Music ==
- Alexander Brown (director) (born 1985), English music video director and designer
- Alexander Brown (musician) (born 1982), Danish DJ, part of Morten Hampenberg & Alexander Brown
- Sandy Brown (musician) (Alexander Brown, 1929–1975), Scottish jazz clarinetist and band leader

== Politics ==
- Sir Alexander Brown, 1st Baronet (1844–1922), British member of parliament who is remembered for many decades of service
- Alexander Brown (Australian politician) (1851–1926), Australian member of New South Wales Legislative Assembly/Legislative Council
- Alexander Laing Brown (1851–1936), British member of parliament for Hawick Burghs, 1886–1892
- Alexander Garnet Brown (1930–2010), Canadian businessman and politician in the Nova Scotia House of Assembly

== Sciences ==
- Alexander Brown (engineer) (1830–1913), New Zealand marine engineer, foundry and shipping company manager
- Alexander Brown (mathematician) (1878–1947), Scottish mathematician who became an academic in South Africa
- Alexander Crum Brown (1838–1922), Scottish organic chemist remembered for his pioneering work in diagramming chemical compounds
- Alexander T. Brown (1854–1929), inventor, engineer, businessman and entrepreneur in Syracuse, New York; see C. E. Lipe Machine Shop

== Other people ==
- Alexander Brown (banker) (1764–1834), Irish banker based in the United States, founder of Alex. Brown & Sons
- Alexander Blaine Brown (1808–1853), president of Jefferson College from 1847 to 1856
- Alexander Brown (author) (1843–1906), American writer who specialized in historical studies of colonial Virginia
- Alexander Kellock Brown (1849–1922), Scottish painter

== Other uses ==
- SS Alexander E. Brown, a Liberty ship

== See also ==
- Alex Brown (disambiguation)
- Sandy Brown (disambiguation)
- Alex Browne (born 1992), Australian rules footballer
- Alexander Browne (disambiguation)
- Alec Brown (born 1992), American player
- Brown (surname)
