= Alex Brown =

Alex Brown may refer to:

== Sports ==
- Alex Brown (cornerback) (born 1996), American football player
- Alex Brown (defensive end) (born 1979), American football player
- Alex Brown (footballer, born 1914) (1914–2006), English football forward for Chesterfield, Darlington, and Mansfield
- Alex Brown (footballer, born 1992), English footballer
- Alex Brown (Liberian footballer) (born 1978)
- Alex Brown (rugby league) (born 1987), Jamaican rugby league player
- Alex Brown (rugby union, born 1905) (1905–1986), Scotland international rugby union player
- Alex Brown (rugby union, born 1979), former English rugby union player
- Alex Brown (rugby union, born 1989), English rugby union player for Exeter Chiefs

== Other people ==
- Alex Brown (academic) (fl. 21st century), Indigenous Australian physician and scientist
- Alex Brown (musician) American pianist
- Alex Brown, businessperson and landowner in the history of Walnut Grove, California

== Other uses ==
- Alex. Brown & Sons, the first investment bank in the United States

== See also ==
- Alex Browne (born 1992), Australian rules footballer
- Alexander Brown (disambiguation)
- Sandy Brown (disambiguation)
