= Sanford Brown =

Sanford Brown may refer to:

- Sanford Brown (politician) (1909–1986), American politician
- Sanford–Brown, education organization

== See also ==
- Sandy Brown (disambiguation)
