= Alexander Browne (disambiguation) =

Alexander Browne (died 1942) was a Northern Irish politician.

Alexander Browne may also refer to:

- Alexander Browne (artist); see Arnold de Jode
- Alexander Browne (figure skating) in 2008 Canadian Figure Skating Championships
- Alexander Browne (painter); see Thomas Thynne (died 1682)

== See also ==
- Alex Browne (born 1992), Australian rules footballer
- Alexander Brown (disambiguation)
