= Gonon =

Gonon may refer to:

== People ==
- François Gonon (born 1979), French orienteering competitor
- Philipp Gonon (born 1955), Swiss educationist

== Places ==
- Gonon, Burkina Faso
- Gonon, Guinea
