= Charles Abbot (botanist) =

British clergyman, botanist and entomologist (1761-1817)

- Born: 24 March 1761
- Died: 8 September 1817; Bedford
- Scientific career
- Fields: Botany; Entomology
- Author abbrev. (botany): C.Abbot

Charles Abbot (24 March 1761 – 8 September 1817) was a British botanist and entomologist.

== Life ==
Abbot was educated at Winchester College and matriculated at New College, Oxford in 1779, with an M.A. degree in 1787. He was elected fellow of the Linnean Society of London in 1793, and he received the degrees of B.D. and D.D. in 1802.

Abbot was vicar of Oakley Raynes and Goldington, in Bedfordshire. He was also Usher of Bedford School, 1787−1817, and chaplain to the Marquess of Tweeddale. He died in Bedford in September 1817.

== Works ==
Abbot is noted for making, in 1798, the first capture in England of Papilio paniscus, the chequered skipper. His writings include the manuscript "Catalogus plantarum" (May 1795); a list of 956 plants of Bedfordshire;, and a later book on the same subject, Flora Bedfordiensis (November 1798). Other works include the 1807 volume of sermons entitled Parochial Divinity. He also wrote a Monody on the Death of Horatio, Lord Nelson, in 1805.
