= Lipe Art Park =

- Interactive map of Lipe Art Park
- Location: Syracuse, New York
- Coordinates: 43.0465°N 76.16897°W
- Area: 2 acres (0.0081 km^{2})
- Created: June 1, 2007
- Operator: City of Syracuse

Lipe Art Park is a public art project and outdoor art venue, and a public recreation space, comprising approximately 2 acres (0.81 ha) of vacant greenspace located on West Fayette Street in Syracuse, New York in the Warehouse District. The park began in 2007 as a project of (R)Evolution studios, a local artist group, and Syracuse's Public Arts Task Force (a sub-group within "40 Below", a project of the city's Metropolitan Development Agency). Its initial aim was to use an urban vacant lot as a space for creative activity for the community.

== History ==
The inaugural exhibition, curated by Ty Marshal, featured the works of local and regional artists working primarily in steel, and commenced with an opening weekend for the park from June 1 to June 3, 2007. The park has since seen several seasonal shows and temporary installations, including the first long-term sculptural installation for the park, "Lipe Art Shark", a concrete and steel sculptural art wall and shelter structure by Brendan Rose, unveiled in May 2010. The project and the park itself are currently managed by the Stewards of Lipe Art Park (SLAP), a 'spin-off' of the Public Arts Task Force.

=== Charles Lipe shop ===
Lipe Art Park aims to nurture art and creativity in an urban, outdoor, public space and to foster a positive and dynamic vision for the community, celebrating Syracuse's rich history and natural environment. Located in a historically thriving, creative neighborhood (the near west side), Lipe Art Park was named after a local inventor and businessman, Charles E. Lipe, who owned the C. E. Lipe Machine Shop at 208 S. Geddes Street. Established in 1880, this shop became an incubator for inventors, with 360 patents coming from the building at the corner of S. Geddes and West Fayette Streets, in Syracuse. C.E. Lipe was known for his many inventions, including a cigar-rolling machine, a broom-winding machine, motion picture equipment, automatic looms and time recorders.

=== Local history ===
The park is located on an urban brownfield site where a multi-track train yard lay in the 19th and early 20th centuries, a yard whose round-house was the site of an important anti-slavery rally in 1852 at which the eminent abolitionist Frederick Douglass spoke. In addition to bringing art, art space, and an awareness of local history to the community, the park is intended to provide a beautiful place in which to experience art, history and nature. Landscape gardens and plantings will not only bring beauty and comfort to visitors, but will be used to begin to restore the ecological health of the brownfield site, and provide ecological information to the public in the process.
