= Reginald Carter (headmaster) =

Reginald Carter (1868-1936) was a Fellow and Tutor of Lincoln College, Oxford, Rector of the Edinburgh Academy, and Headmaster of Bedford School.

== Biography ==
Born in Truro, Cornwall, on 12 January 1868, Reginald Carter was educated at Clifton College, at Balliol College, Oxford, and at Lincoln College, Oxford, where he was Tutor in Classics and elected as a Fellow in 1893. He was Rector of the Edinburgh Academy, between 1902 and 1910, and Headmaster of Bedford School, between 1910 and 1928.

Reginald Carter died on 20 August 1936.
