= Arthur John Pressland =

British educational theorist

Arthur John Pressland FRSE
- Born: 1865
- Died: 8 October 1934 (aged 68–69)
- Education: Bedford Modern School
- Alma mater: St John’s College, Cambridge

Arthur John Pressland FRSE (1865–1934) was a British educational theorist, linguist, schoolmaster and writer. He was for most of his life a mathematician but after Cambridge spent time in Germany and became a committed linguist and educational theorist, the author of a Royal Commission Report on Physical Training in Switzerland in 1902, the translator of Kerchensteiner’s Education for Citizenship in 1911 and the author of Education and Social Welfare in Switzerland in 1927.

Pressland’s obituary written by Sir Michael Sadler in The Times in 1934 stated that ‘Few men in England knew so much as he did about the educational experience of Switzerland, which has had repercussions in this country from the days of Pestalozzi and Emmanuel von Fellenberg to the publication in 1898 of Sir Robert Morant's Special Report on "The National Organization of Education of all grades as practised in Switzerland"’.

== Early life ==
Arthur John Pressland was born in 1865. He was educated at Bedford Modern School where he was a senior exhibitioner in 1881 and made Head of School in 1882. He later won an open exhibition to St John’s College, Cambridge where he won two more open exhibitions and graduated as Twelfth Wrangler in 1886 at the same time as gaining a Foundation Scholarship.

== Career ==
After Cambridge, Pressland went to Germany spending some time as a teacher in Heidelberg. He then taught in Brecon before joining the staff of Edinburgh Academy where he taught mathematics for thirty five years. Aside from mathematics, Pressland mastered several modern languages and was a researcher of different methods of education he observed on the Continent.

As a committed linguist and educational theorist, Pressland was the author of a Royal Commission Report on Physical Training in Switzerland in 1902, the translator of Kerchensteiner’s Education for Citizenship in 1911 and the author of Education and Social Welfare in Switzerland in 1927. Pressland’s obituary written by Sir Michael Sadler in The Times in 1934 stated that ‘Few men in England knew so much as he did about the educational experience of Switzerland, which has had repercussions in this country from the days of Pestalozzi and Emmanuel von Fellenberg to the publication in 1898 of Sir Robert Morant's Special Report on "The National Organization of Education of all grades as practised in Switzerland"’.

In 1890 Pressland moved to Edinburgh to teach Mathematics at Edinburgh Academy. He lived at a flat at 51 Dundas Street near the school.

In 1890, Pressland was elected a Fellow of the Mathematical Society of Edinburgh and in 1892 a Fellow of the Royal Society of Edinburgh. His proposers were John Steggall, John Sturgeon Mackay, Peter Guthrie Tait and Sir John Murray.

== Later years ==
In 1925 Pressland retired to Cambridge where he died on 8 October 1934. He left a legacy to St John’s College, Cambridge in which he requested that ‘no monument be erected to his memory and that no photograph of himself should be kept’.

Sir Michael Sadler wrote in The Times that ‘The comparative study of systems and atmospheres of education has lost an ardent and purposeful worker. From his long experience as a schoolmaster, Pressland had drawn up a plan for a staff college for English teachers in higher schools-a rough sketch to which administrators are not unlikely to turn in future’.

Following the obituary by Sir Michael Sadler, Mr M.R. McLarty wrote to The Times on 15 October 1934 stating that ‘who can appreciate the amount of invaluable 'work which he quietly and unassumingly accomplished in their interests... Mr. Pressland guided those who had been his pupils throughout their entire academic career. His assistance did not stop there, and there are many to-day who owe him not only their vocations but also the inspiration which guides them.

== Selected works ==
- On The History And Degree Of Certain Geometrical Approximations: Part I by Arthur John Pressland. Published 1892
- Geometrical Drawing by Arthur John Pressland. Published by Rivington, Percival & Company Limited, London, 1897
- Elementary Trigonometry by Arthur John Pressland and Charles Tweedie. Published Edinburgh, 1899
- Elementary Trigonometry II by Arthur John Pressland and Charles Tweedie. Published by Oliver and Boyd in Edinburgh and Simpkin Marshall & Co Ltd, London, 1899
- The Annual Report Of The Central Board Of Education For Zürich by Arthur John Pressland and Francis Galton. Published by Oliver & Boyd, Edinburgh and London, 1902
- An Introduction To The Study Of Geometry by Arthur John Pressland. Published London, 1904
- Murray’s School Arithmetic For Pupils Between The Ages Of Ten And Seventeen by Arthur John Pressland. Published by John Murray, London, 1907
- Education For Citizenship by Georg Kerschensteiner and Arthur John Pressland. Published by Rand McNally & Company, Chicago, 1911
- A Primer Of Geometry by Wilfrid Parkinson and Arthur John Pressland. Published by Clarendon Press, Oxford, 1923
- A Second Geometry by J Davidson and AJ Pressland. Published by Clarendon Press, Oxford, 1926
- Education And Social Welfare In Switzerland: to commemorate the Pestalozzi centenary 17th February 1927 by Arthur John Pressland. Published by George G. Harrap and Co., London, 1927
