= Alexander Brown (mathematician) =

(1877 – 1948) Scottish Mathematician and educator in South Africa

- Born: 5 May 1878; Dalkeith, Scotland
- Died: 27 January 1947 (aged 68); Cape Town, South Africa
- Citizenship: South African
- Education: Newton Public School; George Watson's College; University of Edinburgh; Gonville and Caius College, Cambridge
- Known for: Ratio of incommensurables and geometry of regular polygons
- Spouse: Mary Graham
- Scientific career
- Workplaces: High School of Dundee; South African College (University of Cape Town)

Alexander Brown FRSE FRSSAf (1878–1947) was a Scottish-born mathematician and educator in South Africa. He contributed to the study of the ratio of incommensurables in geometry and relations between the distances of a point from three vertices of a regular polygon.

== Career ==
Brown was born in Dalkeith, near Edinburgh, Scotland on 5 May 1878. He attended Newton Public School and then George Watson's College, where he was the winner of the Wright Bursary in his final year. He matriculated at the University of Edinburgh in 1893 where he obtained a MA (Mathematics and Natural Science)(First Class) and a BSc (Mathematics and Natural Science)(Special Distinction) in 1897. While at Edinburgh University he held the first Heriot Bursary and Mackay Smith scholarship. On completion of his degrees he won the Vans Dunlop scholarship, the Baxter scholarship and the Drummond scholarship.

He was mathematical master at the High School of Dundee from 1897 to 1899. In 1899 he won the Ferguson Scholarship in Mathematics and he went to Gonville and Caius College, Cambridge where he obtained a First Class in Mathematics in 1902.

In 1903 he became Deputy Professor of Applied Mathematics and Physics for one year at the South African College, Cape Town in the absence of the holder of the chair, Carruthers Beattie, who was on a year-long magnetic survey of South Africa. In recognition of Brown's exceptional work during that year the College Council split the Chair and Beattie was offered the professorship of Physics while Brown was offered the professorship of Mathematics. He retained this position until his death on 27 January 1947.

He was elected a Fellow of the Royal Society of Edinburgh in 1907. His proposers were George Chrystal, Arthur John Pressland, John Sturgeon Mackay and John Alison. In 1918 he was elected a Fellow of the Royal Society of South Africa.

== Personal life ==
He married Mary Graham in 1911 and they had a daughter and a son. In his leisure time he was a great reader and a keen musician.

== Works ==
He contributed to the study of the ratio of incommensurables in geometry and relations between the distances of a point from three vertices of a regular polygon. His paper on this subject was read before the Edinburgh Mathematical Society on 11 June 1909.

== Selected publications ==
- Brown, A. (1905) "Convergence of a Reversed Power Series" British Association Report
- Brown, A. (1907) "Examination of the Validity of an Approximate Solution of a Certain Velocity Equation" Transaction of the South African Philosophical Society, vol xvi, pt. 3
- Brown, A. (1916) "The Equivalent Mass of a Spring Vibrating Longitudinally" Transactions of the Royal Society of South Africa vol. v, p. 565.
- Brown, A. (1916) "The Arrangement of Successive Convergents in the Order of Accuracy" Transactions of the Royal Society of South Africa vol. v, p. 653.
- Brown, A. (1916) "The Use of a Standard Parabola for Drawing Diagrams of Bending Moment and of Shear in a Beam Uniformly Loaded" Transactions of the Royal Society of South Africa vol. v, p. 659.
