= Murray Browne =

Australian rules footballer

Personal information
- Born: 20 January 1963 (age 63)
- Original team: Watsonia (DVFL)

Playing career^{1}
Years	Club	Games (Goals)
1981–1985	Collingwood	47 (6)
1986	Fitzroy	6 (0)
- ^{1} Playing statistics correct to the end of 1986.

Murray Browne (born 20 January 1963) is a former Australian rules football player for Collingwood and Fitzroy in the Victorian Football League (VFL). His son Alex played in the Australian Football League (AFL), the successor league to the VFL, for Essendon Football Club.

Originally from Diamond Valley Football League (DVFL) club Watsonia, Browne played 53 VFL games in total; 47 for Collingwood from 1981 to 1985, and 6 for Fitzroy in 1986. Playing mainly in defence he kicked 6 career goals.

Browne won the 1981 Collingwood Reserves Best and Fairest award and played in the 1984 Senior final series when Collingwood made the Preliminary final.

Browne is a former President of the Collingwood Past Players Association and former Past Player Director of the AFL Players Association (AFLPA).
