= Sandra Brown (disambiguation) =

Sandra Brown (born 1948) is an American author.

Sandra Brown may also refer to:

- Sandra Brown (campaigner) (born 1949), Scottish campaigner and expert on child protection issues
- Sandra Brown (cricketer) (1939–2024), England cricketer
- Sandra Brown (sprinter) (born 1946), Australian sprinter
- Sandra Brown (ultradistance athlete) (born 1949), British ultra distance walker/runner

== See also ==
- Sandy Brown (disambiguation)
