= Bembridge School =

Coordinates: 50.676°N 1.093°W

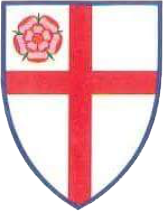

Location
- Hillway; Bembridge, Isle of Wight; England

Information
- Type: Independent school
- Motto: TO-DAY
- Established: 1919
- Closed: 1997
- Staff: 40 (approx.)
- Gender: co-ed
- Age: 13 to 18
- Enrolment: 400
- Houses: 6
- Colour: Light blue/dark blue
- Former pupils: Old Bembridgians

Bembridge School was a British independent school in Bembridge on the Isle of Wight, founded in 1919 by social reformer and Liberal MP John Howard Whitehouse, set in over 100 acres (0.40 km^{2}) on the easternmost tip of the island. Whitehouse intended for the school, initially for boys only, to challenge the traditional concept of education, introducing subjects including woodwork, American history and modern languages, long before they became mainstream subjects in British schools.

The school grew from five students at its opening in 1919, to an enrolment of 264 by the time of Whitehouse's death in 1955. During the Second World War the site was used as a military base by the Army and the school moved to The Waterhead Hotel in Coniston, close to Brantwood, the former home of John Ruskin, which was owned by the school. The school returned to Bembridge in 1945.

The school was founded based on the teachings of John Ruskin, and had a large collection of art, books and memorabilia relating to him, including many notable manuscripts. This collection is now housed in the Ruskin Library at the University of Lancaster.

Shortly after the school's 75th anniversary, the Education Trust announced their intention to sell the school, whilst retaining possession of the Ruskin collection.

== History ==
=== Early years ===
Bembridge school was founded in 1919 by John Howard Whitehouse, whose ideas were strongly influenced by the 19th-century art critic and writer John Ruskin. Beginning with five pupils, the school grew quickly and by summer 1920 there were 42 students, increasing to over 100 by 1924.

The Warden and boys visiting Fridtjof Nansen in Oslo

Whitehouse, known as the Warden, had left Parliament at the height of his career and was thus able to attract pupils from a number of influential parents. This brought much interest from many society figures of the day of Whitehouse's acquaintance, many of whom became involved in the school. Early visitors to the school included John Masefield, Walter de la Mare, Henry Nevinson and Isaac Foot.

As the school grew, it expanded from its base in Old House, beginning in 1920 with the building of Culver Cottage, and continuing with the Gymnasium (later known as The Little Theatre) in 1924. The school entered a phase of rapid building work between 1927 and 1939. The Warden's House and New House were finished in 1927, and the Ruskin Galleries in 1930. Junior House (the "Big Room" and Nansen Dorm) was built in 1929. In 1933 work began on the chapel, and the first service was held in Spring 1934. The refectory and library were completed in 1938. By the outbreak of war the school's appearance was similar to the present day.

During the early years of the school, students were encouraged to participate in annual trips to Europe known as "School Journeys", which started in 1924 with a trip to Venice. One such trip was to Oslo to meet the explorer Fridtjof Nansen, and another was to Rome to meet Benito Mussolini, whom the Bembridge students presented with paintings by John Ruskin.

=== Coniston ===
Bembridge boys by the Waterhead Hotel

When war broke out, each school-house was equipped with an air-raid shelter, and the school beach was laid with barbed wire. The Royal Artillery were present on Culver Down. In summer 1940, the school was relocated, with all its contents, to the Lake District, to Ruskin's former home of Brantwood, previously purchased by Whitehouse, and the nearby Waterhead Hotel.

In Spring 1945, the school was derequisitioned by the military, who had been stationed there, and handed back to Whitehouse. The students returned to Bembridge in the Christmas term, though annual excursions to Brantwood continued into peacetime.

The School Chapel has two versions of the War Memorial to Old Bembridgians who died in the Second World War. On the exterior of the building is a stone plaque set into the brickwork, while in the Chapel itself is a wooden plaque. Over the Chapel door is a sculpture representing St George and the dragon.

=== Post War ===
View alongside the school drive

The school continued to grow into the 1990s, adding several new facilities over the next few decades including Kilgerran House, a music block, squash courts, the Stedman Sports Hall and additions to the preparatory school and the formation of a pre-prep. The grounds contained three cricket pitches, a nine-hole golf course, two football/rugby pitches, tennis courts and a hockey pitch. Pupils were also able to go swimming in the sea, and practice shooting and climbing at the cliffs at Whitecliff Bay.

In 1994, Bembridge School celebrated its 75th anniversary celebrations. Nine months later, just before the summer term in 1995, the headmaster announced at a regular staff meeting that the school's owners had decided to sell the school. A committee was established, chaired by Dr Peter Randall, to investigate ways to save the school. Meetings were held with a representative of the Trustees and the committee believed it could raise the money to take over the school. However, it was announced that an agreement had already been made to sell the whole establishment to Ryde School.

Ryde School continued to run Bembridge as a separate unit, although the Dyslexia department and the Pre-Prep School were closed, and the Junior school would no longer operate as a separate entity. By the end of the term, many parents had withdrawn their children. Some teaching staff remained, but some took early retirement, and others had to leave the Isle of Wight to find employment.

Camp Beaumont, Kingswood Centre, Bembridge Boarding Campus is now run at Bembridge School site. The school's Ruskin collection is now housed at Lancaster University.

== Houses ==
=== Old House ===
Old House is the only building on the current site to predate the school. Originally known as The Old School House, it came into Whitehouse's possession in 1914 and formed the centre of the development of the early school. The building was extended in 1921 to make space for dining facilities, and balconies were constructed in 1932 and 1934.

As the school expanded across the site, the Old House was used as the school's main building and administrative centre. The large room to the right of the entrance hall became the Headmaster's Study, and the room to the right the Masters' Common Room. In later years, Old House became the girls' boarding house.

In 1928 courtyard house was built in the courtyard alongside Old House as a home for various Housemasters (and later Housemistresses). It was first occupied by Edward Dawes, Sub-Warden of the school, and most recently by Matron Anne Sutton.

=== New House ===
New House, with its leaded light windows and sea views, was registered as a Grade II listed building in 1994, and continues to be used by Ryde School, the new owners of Bembridge School.

=== Nansen ===
Nansen House was a building outside the school grounds, on Howgate Lane, and was purchased rather than built by the school. It was originally a large family home called Southcliffe, and was acquired by the school in 1958 as accommodation for 20 boys under the first Housemaster, Henry Warren. It was renamed to Nansen in 1961, in honour of the explorer who had links to the school, and subsequently underwent a number of extensions.

=== Kilgerran ===
Kilgerran House was opened by Lord Lloyd of Kilgerran, president of the school, in 1981, and first occupied by students in the Christmas term. The last house to be built at Bembridge, it has three floors and was built in the school's trademark red brick, overlooking the junior cricket pitches on its northern side and McIver's house to the South.

The house and dormitories were refurbished in 1989, and the Nansen Wing (or Sixth Form centre) was added to the east side of the house, looking across the new Junior School quadrangle and the refectory.

== Presidents of the School ==
Dean Inge (front left) with John Masefield, John Howard Whitehouse and others

There were four Presidents of Bembridge School from its foundation in 1919. The first President was John Masefield, who was later named Poet Laureate. Masefield was followed by writer and academic William Ralph Inge, known as "The Gloomy Dean". Upon Inge's death the position was given to economist and social reformer William Beveridge, who had known the Warden from their time in Government together and had similar political views. He took the position in 1954 and served until his death in 1963, to be followed by Liberal politician Rhys Lloyd.

== Old Bembridgians ==
The Old Bembridgian Association was founded in 1923. The president is Sandy Rogers, and the honorary secretary is Christopher Holder.

Notable Old Bembridgians include Dingle Foot MP (former Solicitor General), John Foot (parliamentarian), John Brandon-Jones (architect), Robin Day (broadcaster), Michael Relph (film maker), Barry Field (former MP for the Isle of Wight), Peter Whiteley (former Royal Marine and Governor of Jersey), John Heath-Stubbs (poet), Patrick Gosling (soap star), Richard Parsons (ambassador and novelist), Laurence Broderick (sculptor) and Andrew Morris (conductor and organist), Richard Studt (violinist) .
