= Andrew Morris (organist/conductor) =

British conductor & organist (born 1948)

Andrew Morris (born 18 December 1948) is a British conductor, organist, adjudicator and teacher based in Cambridge.

== Biography ==
Andrew Morris was brought up on the Isle of Wight. He was a boy chorister of Westminster Abbey under Sir William McKie and then gained a music scholarship to Bembridge School before entering the Royal Academy of Music in 1967, where he studied organ, piano and conducting. He then read for both MA and BMus degrees at the University of London before taking the MEd degree by Research at Pembroke College, Cambridge, where he was also Schoolmaster Fellow Commoner. He is a Fellow of Trinity College London, was elected an Associate of the Royal Academy of Music by the Governing Body of the Royal Academy of Music in 1988 and given the honorary award of ARSCM by the Royal School of Church Music in 2019 for his work in church music, choral music and music education. As an historian, his interests lie in the thirteenth century and his book The King's Uncle: William de Valence and the Conquest of Wales, published by Pen and Sword Books (2026), considers England's difficulties in Poitou and Gascony, the Second Barons' War and the conquest of Wales.

== Career ==
In 1971 Andrew Morris succeeded Brian Brockless as Organist and Director of Music at the Priory Church of St Bartholomew-the-Great, Smithfield, in the City of London. During his 8-year tenure at the Church he developed both the music within the liturgy and the concert programmes. The choir, under his direction, focused on the performance of sixteenth, early seventeenth and twentieth century music, making records with Abbey Records and broadcasting on BBC Radio 3 and ITV. He also directed the music for the annual Dedication Service of the Imperial Society of Knights Bachelor which took place at St Bartholomew-the-Great where the Knights Bachelor Chapel was then situated. While at St Bartholomew's he re-founded the New English Singers in 1974 and he conducted concerts with the group in and around London with various instrumental groups including the English Consort of Viols. His work with adult chamber choirs continued and, in 1985, he founded the New Bedford Singers which he conducted for 10 years in concerts in the home counties. At St Bartholomew-the-Great he directed several festivals, all of which were widely acclaimed in the national press both for the quality of the performances and the originality of the programmes. The Festival to celebrate the 850th Anniversary of the founding of St Bartholomew's Priory and Hospital in 1973 included performances by the London Bach Society under Paul Steinitz, the Schutz Choir of London under Roger Norrington, The Aeolian String Quartet and The King's Singers. The Festival to celebrate The Queen's Silver Jubilee in 1977, sponsored by The Stock Exchange, featured concerts by the New English Singers under Andrew Morris and the London Schubert Orchestra under Brian Brockless performing mostly twentieth century works.

The two International Festivals of Twentieth Century Music in 1978 and 1979 which Morris directed in collaboration with the composer Paul Patterson contained performances by some of the UK's leading contemporary music ensembles and a concert of works by Krzysztof Penderecki conducted by the composer. There were 11 world premieres, 10 British premieres and 8 London premieres performed in the 1978 festival. In the 1979 festival, all the (then) Sequenzas of Luciano Berio were performed and, in addition, there were 8 world premieres, 10 British premieres and 4 London premieres. Andrew Morris conducted the London premieres of Judica Me, Opus 96 (Lennox Berkeley), The Leaden Echo and the Golden Echo (Elizabeth Maconchy) and Canticle of the Mother of God (John Tavener). In his festival organ recital, Andrew Morris gave the British premieres of Jubilate (Augustine Bloch), Hvar Litany (Miroslav Miletic) and Triphtogus I (Pal Karolyi) and the London premiere of Games (Paul Patterson), which had been commissioned by the 1977 St Albans International Organ Festival.

As an organ recitalist, Andrew Morris gave regular recitals at St Bartholomew-the-Great during his time there and, at various times, he has appeared as organist at venues such as the Royal Albert Hall, the Royal Festival Hall, St Paul's Cathedral, King's College, Cambridge, Hexham Abbey, Bedford School Chapel and most of the churches of the City of London.

In 1972 Andrew Morris was appointed Professor of Harmony and Piano at the London College of Music, where he remained until 1976, and he was also appointed Director of Music at Christ's College, Finchley, where he taught until 1979.

In 1979 Andrew Morris became Director of Music at Bedford School where he remained for 32 years. During this time at Bedford, he developed the Music School into one of the largest school music departments in the UK and brought its music making to unprecedented heights. He also presided over the building of an award-winning new Music School, designed by Eric Parry RA and opened in March 2006 by Sir Peter Maxwell Davies, Master of The Queen's Music. Under Andrew Morris's direction the School's First Orchestra played most of the Classical and Romantic concerto and symphonic repertoire as well as symphonies by Sibelius and Nielsen and new works by British composers such as Paul Patterson and the recipients of the Composer-in-Residence Scheme which Morris set up at Bedford School (with funds from the Maingot Trust), Alan Charlton, Paul Whitmarsh, Tim Watts and James Lark. With the School Choral Society, Morris conducted many of the major choral works including Bach's B minor Mass, the St John Passion, the St Matthew Passion, Handel's Israel in Egypt and Samson, the Verdi Requiem and Elgar's The Dream of Gerontius to name but a few. Under Morris's direction, the First Orchestra and Choral Society were featured in the BBC 'Youth Orchestras of the World' series in a new work by John Tavener. Andrew Morris also took the Chapel Choir, with whom he established a strong cathedral repertoire in the weekly Chapel services, to sing in many English cathedrals and churches, including St Paul's Cathedral and Westminster Abbey, and on tours to Madrid (including Madrid Cathedral) Venice (which included a concert in the Basilica dei Frari and Mass on the Feast of the Assumption in the Basilica di San Marco) and Paris (which included the Sunday morning Mass in Notre Dame, a concert in La Madeleine and a concert in Chartres Cathedral as part of the Cathedral Festival). His notable pupils include the international conductor and violinist Andrew Manze, Royal Opera House timpanist and Professor of Timpani at the Royal Academy of Music Christopher Ridley, composer and choral director Philip Stopford, pianist and conductor William Vann, Paul and Barnaby Smith, CEO and music director respectively of the Voces8 Foundation, counter-tenor Matthew Venner, musicologist and Lecturer in the Faculty of Music of the University of Leeds Dr Ross Cole and the former England cricket captain Sir Alastair Cook, CBE. At Bedford School Morris established a Visiting Fellows scheme, made up of advisers to the Music Department and to the Bedford boys, who included Sir Stephen Cleobury, CBE (then Director of Music at King's College, Cambridge), Andrew Manze (then Chief Conductor of the Helsingborg Symphony Orchestra and Associate Guest Conductor of the BBC Scottish Symphony Orchestra), Richard Egarr (then Director of the Academy of Ancient Music), Paul Patterson (then Manson Professor of Composition at the Royal Academy of Music) and Sir Roger Wright, CBE (then Controller of BBC Radio 3 and Director of the BBC Proms). While at Bedford, Andrew Morris was a Trustee of the St Albans Cathedral Music Trust. He also became a Founding Trustee of Voces Cantabiles Music, now the Voces8 Foundation.

Andrew Morris has been actively involved in the contemporary music scene throughout his career and was a member of the executive committee of the New Macnaghten Concerts from 1978 to 1984 and chairman from 1981 to 1984. He was associated with the Park Lane Group from 1985 until its demise in 2022 and was a member of the artistic committee, the committee of management and finally the advisory council. In addition, he was a member of the Committee of the RAM Club at the Royal Academy of Music from 1998 to 2010 and served as President of the RAM Club from 2005 to 2006.

Andrew Morris has been engaged in music education at a national level throughout most of his career. From 1996 to 1997 he was President of the Music Masters' and Mistresses' Association (MMA), now called the Music Teachers' Association, which is the largest and the longest established association of professional music teachers in the UK. He served as a member of the MMA Committee from 1988 to 1998 and as honorary secretary from 1989 to 1995. During his time as MMA President, he established strong links with the Schools Music Association (SMA), the newly formed Federation of Music Services (FMS) and the National Association of Music Educators (NAME) to enable the independent and state school sectors to collaborate and respond with one voice to proposals from the Teacher Training Agency, the examination boards and government departments. He founded and chaired both the MMA Academic Sub-Committee from 1995 to 2000 and the MMA University Liaison Sub-Committee 2002 to 2007.

In 1995, Andrew Morris founded a forum for HMC directors of music to encourage mutual support, best practice in music teaching and to exchange ideas. The first meeting took place at Pembroke College, Cambridge, in March 1996 and the forum continues to this day under the name of The Band. He was a member of the executive committee of the Music Education Council from 1996 to 1999. In addition, he was an examiner for the Associated Board of the Royal Schools of Music from 1981 to 2019, examining throughout the UK, Hong Kong, Singapore and Malaysia. He has advised a number of HMC schools on their music school development and appointments of directors of music both in the UK and overseas, including St Paul's School, São Paulo, Brazil. Aside from music education, Andrew Morris was a member of the Governing Body (School Council) at the Old Rectory School, Brettenham, Suffolk, from 1992 until 2005 and was chairman from 1995 until 2005.

From 2018 to 2024, Andrew Morris was a Visiting Professor at Trinity Laban Conservatoire of Music and Dance in Greenwich. He currently supervises tonal skills and general musicianship in a number of colleges at the University of Cambridge. He is a member of the Music Committee at Pembroke College, Cambridge, and is a former Senior Treasurer of Pembroke College Music Society. He is a Trustee and the Cambridge Treasurer of Pembroke College Settlement, Pembroke House, in Walworth, South London, and takes a special interest in the work there of the Pembroke Academy of Music. He is also a Trustee of Cambridge Early Music, a music charity which organises concerts and summer schools in Cambridge.

In 2011 he was commissioned by the Bernarr Rainbow Trust to co-author and edit an update of Rainbow's Music and the English Public School. The new book Music in Independent Schools is the last of the Rainbow books on historic texts to be revised and Morris contributed several chapters to this book. He is also co-author, with Ralph Allwood, of Trinity College London's "Sight Reading - A progressive method" for Singing examination candidates from Initial to Grade 8, published by Trinity College London Press in 2023.

Andrew Morris was Master of the Worshipful Company of Musicians 2015 to 2016 and now serves on the Court of the Company as a Past Master. He was formerly chairman of the Musicians' Company Concerts Committee and is a former President of the Company's Livery Club. In 2010, he was elected as Vice-Chairman to the Friends of the Musicians' Chapel committee, a body which acts as custodian of the Musicians' Chapel and the Musicians' Book of Remembrance contained within the Musicians' Chapel at the Church of St Sepulchre-without-Newgate, also known as Holy Sepulchre, in the City of London. In 2014, succeeded Simon Lindley as Chairman. He has been involved in a number of initiatives to help young musicians perform at the Church and he established the committee to oversee the restoration of the historic organ at St Sepulchre's on which Sir Henry Wood learnt to play as a boy and whose ashes are buried within the Musicians' Chapel. He is also responsible for the move to return the Service of Thanksgiving after the BBC Proms to the Church when the chaplet, placed on Sir Henry Wood's bust at the Last Night, is placed on Wood's Grave in the Musicians' Chapel.
