= Clarence Seaman =

Clarence Milton Edwards Seaman CBE (1908–1974) was Rector of the Edinburgh Academy, Headmaster of Bedford School, and Headmaster of Christ's Hospital.

== Biography ==
Born in 1908, 'George' Seaman was educated at Christ's Hospital and at St John's College, Oxford. He taught Classics at Bedford School, between 1932 and 1939, and at Rugby School, between 1939 and 1945. He was Rector of the Edinburgh Academy, between 1945 and 1951, Headmaster of Bedford School, between 1951 and 1955, and Headmaster of Christ's Hospital, between 1955 and 1970.

George Seaman retired in 1970 and was invested as a Commander of the Order of the British Empire in 1971. He died on 18 November 1974.
