= Bedford School =

Public school in Bedford, England

Coordinates: 52.1415°N 0.46371°W

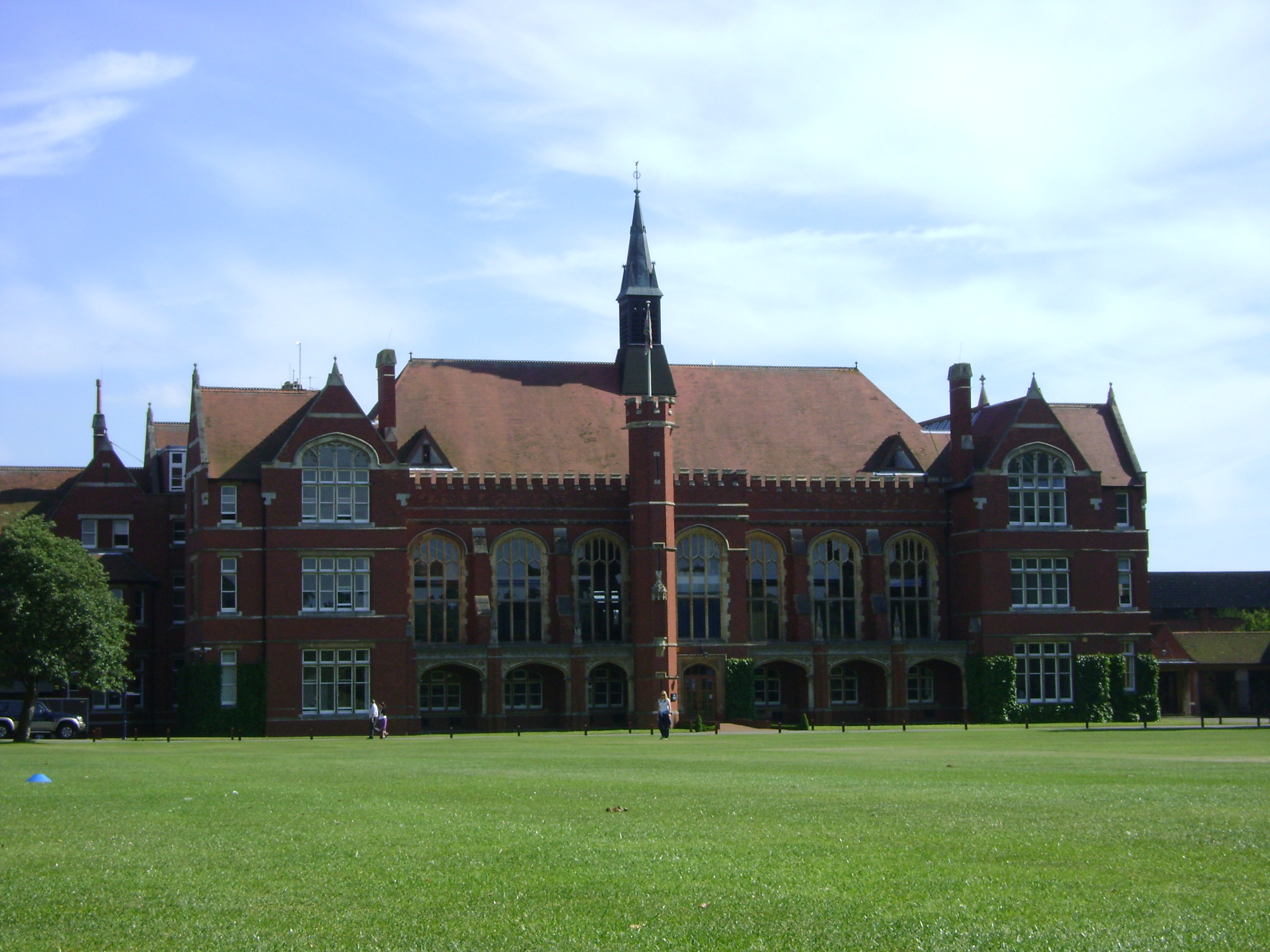
- School badge A view of the north side of Bedford School's Main School Building

Location
- De Parys Avenue; Bedford, Bedfordshire, MK40 2TU; England

Information
- Type: 7–18 Public school Private day and boarding school
- Motto: Latin: Floreat Schola Bedfordiensis (English:May Bedford School Flourish)
- Religious affiliation: Church of England
- Established: 1552; 474 years ago
- Founder: Edward VI
- Department for Education URN: 109718 Tables
- Headmaster: Michael Sloan
- Gender: Boys
- Age: 7 to 18
- Enrolment: 696
- Student to teacher ratio: 9:1
- Campus size: 50-acre (20 ha)
- Campus type: Semi-rural
- Colours: Navy and white
- Publication: The Ousel
- Alumni: Old Bedfordians
- Boat Club: Bedford School Boat Club
- Website: www.bedfordschool.org.uk

Bedford School is a public school (English private boarding and day school) in Bedford, Bedfordshire, England. Founded in 1552 by royal charter, it is one of the oldest boys' schools in the United Kingdom and is administered by the Harpur Trust. The school currently educates boys aged 7 to 18 but is scheduled to become co-educational from September 2027.

The school occupies an approximately 50-acre site on De Parys Avenue and comprises the Preparatory School (ages 7 to 13) and the Upper School (ages 13 to 18). It has a long association with boarding, sport, music, the arts and academic education, and counts several prominent sportsmen, academics and public figures among its former pupils.There are around 1,100 pupils, of whom approximately one half are boarders.

== History ==
=== Background ===
Although no large-scale educational institution had existed in Bedford before the foundation of Bedford School, the collegiate St Paul's Church had run systems to teach Bedford's youth Latin and church history since at least 1086. This was overseen by Bedford's archdeacon, but this ceased when the church's monks became canons regular, moving to Newnham Priory; until the priory's dissolution in 1540, education in Bedford continued elsewhere in the town. This medieval school, located on "Scolestreet", later Mill Lane, had ended by 1447.

=== Establishment and early years ===
On 15 August 1552, Edward VI issued letters patent in Ely allowing the "Mayors, Bailiffs, Burgesses and Commonality of Bedford" to establish a grammar school in the town. The letters instructed boys to be taught by a Master and Usher chosen by the Warden and Fellows of New College, Oxford.

Edmund Greene became the school's first headmaster. He had already been teaching in Bedford for four years before the establishment of the school – Greene's relationship to the college was the reason for its appointment to choose the school's leadership.

In 1552, William Harpur, likely an alumnus of the early school on Mill Lane, donated a building to the school. In 1566 he transferred several parcels of meadowland around Bedford and Holborn to provide the school with a permanent source of income. These endowments subsequently became the foundation of the Harpur Trust.

A decline in pupil numbers followed widespread concerns over corporal punishment – a student almost died after being attacked by the school's usher. Bedford began boarding in 1656 under the headmastership of George Butler, expanding the school, although boarding ended by 1660.

For much of the following century and a half, the school remained relatively small. Contemporary accounts attribute this partly to ineffective leadership and limited funding. It also grew little in social standing as compared to schools such as Winchester, Westminster, or Eton, this may also be partially attributed to its location in Bedford and lack of architecturally attractive estate.

In 1764, the Harpur Trust was formally created by an Act of Parliament, the Harpur Trust Act 1764 (4 Geo. 3. c. 72), to administer William Harpur's endowment.

After the Great Fire of London, much of Harpur's land in London was built on, and so by 1900, the Harpur Trust was receiving payments from these of around £14,000 (equivalent to £1,487,779 in 2025) per year. Following its foundation, Bedford School expanded greatly, increasing its head count and restoring its buildings.

The school's expansion also resulted in the separation of the "Writing School", which later developed into Bedford Modern School.

=== Nineteenth century ===
Boarding was reintroduced around 1810 under headmaster John Brereton. By 1820, Bedford had 84 students, of which half were boarders.

During Brereton's tenure, Bedford adopted many characteristics associated with the Victorian public-school system, including fagging, and compulsory Christianity. The school's curriculum was broadened, and the school was modernised.

=== Twenty-first century ===
During the early twenty-first century, Bedford School continued to develop its academic, sporting and extracurricular facilities. In 2002, the Charles Piazzi Smyth Observatory and Wolfson Planetarium were opened by Prince Philip, Duke of Edinburgh.

The school remained a boys-only institution until 2026, when the Harpur Trust announced plans for a major change to its structure.

==== Transition to co-education ====
On 1 September 2026, the Harpur Trust announced that Bedford School would become co-educational by 2027. The change will end the school's 474-year history as an institution educating boys only.

Under the plans, girls will be able to enter all year groups in both the Preparatory and Upper Schools. Boarding will also be opened to girls, with full, weekly and flexi-boarding available. Girls will be able to board from Year 7.

The Harpur Trust said the decision followed research into changing parental expectations and developments in the independent-school sector. The Trust said that it had undertaken research and parental consultation over the preceding year before deciding to make the change. Trust chief executive David Steadman described the decision as widening access to the school rather than fundamentally altering its character.

The transition requires changes to the school's facilities. Burnaby House is being converted into a dedicated girls' house for day pupils and boarders. The school is also expanding its sporting provision, including the introduction of netball and other girls' sports alongside existing sports such as rowing, cricket, athletics and golf. Plans also include a new Sixth Form centre.

==== Opposition and controversy ====
The decision provoked a backlash from some parents, alumni and members of the Bedford School community, particularly after the school acknowledged that there had been no formal consultation before the decision to admit girls was made, or that existing or prospective parents were warned of the changes.

A petition calling for the school to remain boys-only accused the leadership and the Harpur Trust of imposing one of the most significant changes in the school's history without giving parents, pupils or alumni a meaningful opportunity to influence the outcome. An FAQ document was issued by the Trust reiterating that the Trust and schools are still in a financially stable situation and that they felt now was the right time to make changes.

== Buildings and grounds ==
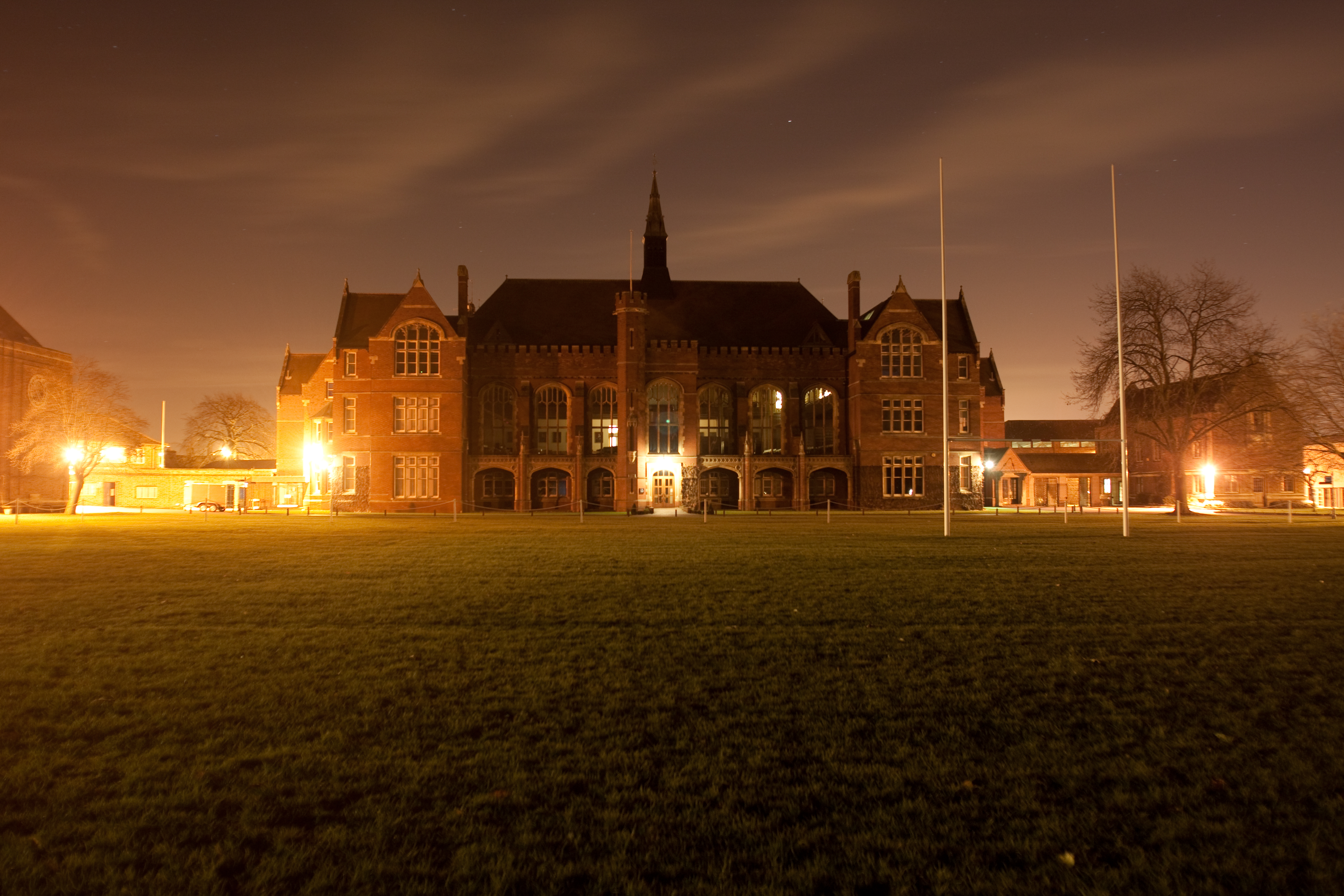
Bedford School's Main School Building at night, viewed from the Sports Field

The Main School Building, originally built in 1891, is a Gothic Revival Grade II listed building. On the night of 3–4 March 1979, much of the building was gutted by fire as a result of arson. The internal structure of the building was destroyed and thirty classrooms were lost. Almost all pupil records were saved but books, furniture and the large collection of portraits of former headmasters were lost. However, the school was in full operation on Monday 5 March.

Bedford School Chapel was completed in 1908 and is a Grade II* listed building. It is significant as the last architectural accomplishment of George Frederick Bodley, a prominent Victorian architect who worked in the Gothic Revival style. Other notable buildings by Bodley include the chapels of Marlborough College and Queens' College, Cambridge. In 2005, various refurbishment projects took place within the chapel. Most significantly, the ceiling was restored to its former Bodlian watercolour design, the original having been painted over in the 1960s due to deterioration. At the same time, the interior walls were redecorated and the stonework cleaned. The chapel is home to Bedford School's chapel choir and houses a fine two-manual Hill, Norman & Beard organ. The specification of this instrument can be found in the National Pipe Organ Register.

The Charles Piazzi Smyth Observatory and the Wolfson Planetarium were opened in May 2002 by Prince Philip, Duke of Edinburgh. Situated on the Bedford School estate, the facility is operated by the school's astronomer in conjunction with members of the Bedford Astronomical Society. The observatory was named after an Old Bedfordian who went on to become the Astronomer Royal for Scotland. It has a custom-designed GRP dome and a computer-controlled twelve-inch (305mm) telescope. The telescope has a hydrogen alpha filter, which enables the observer to view the magnetic plasma flow around the sun. The adjacent Planetarium was named after the Wolfson Foundation.

== School structure ==
=== Admissions ===
Bedford School aims to maintain the Christian ethos which was embedded into its foundation principles when established, but commits to admitting boys of all faiths, or boys with no faith.

In September 2026, the school announced that it would become co-educational in September 2027.

The first year at Bedford School (for 13- to 14-year-olds) is called the Fourth Form and is equivalent to Year 9 in the state system. After that come the Remove and the Fifth Form. The next two years are the Lower Sixth and the Upper Sixth. Bedford School also caters for the lower years (from Year 3 to Year 8) in Bedford Preparatory School. This is located on the Bedford School estate and many facilities are shared.

Year Group	State school equivalent	IB	A-Level
Fourth Form	Year 9	-	-
Remove	Year 10	-	-
Fifth Form	Year 11	-	-
Lower Sixth	Year 12	IB1	AS
Upper Sixth	Year 13	IB2	A2

Boys attending Bedford School typically come from a variety of various professional families in Bedford, elsewhere in the United Kingdom, as well as overseas. In 2016, the school had 139 boys as English as an Additional Language (EAL), and 57 boys who received additional support in learning for special educational needs, such as dyslexia, and physical disabilities.

=== Academic attainment ===
Independent Schools Inspectorate (ISI) inspected Bedford School in November 2016, and found quality of personal development provided for boys attending the school to be "excellent". Boys attending Bedford School during the inspection were praised for having "respect for others", having a good "understanding of right and wrong", showing "kindness and sensitivity" and demonstrating "responsibility for others". Academic attainment across the school was strong, with boys making "rapid" progress in all curriculum areas whilst developing a wide range of learning skills, including independence of thought and the ability to clearly communicate.

Boys attending the Preparatory School at Bedford School achieve high standards, and in the Senior School, boys academic performance at GCSE level is above the national average. Results in GCSE examinations in the Sixth Form were also strong and found to be above the national average. Boys of all ages across the school, from Preparatory to Sixth Form, were found to be achieving strongly in key areas such as Language and Communication, as well as Numeracy and Mathematics. Following the inspection in November 2016, it was concluded that boys attending Bedford School had well–developed mathematical skills.

=== House system ===
Bedford School has six houses. Each has a day house and an associated boarding house.

=== School officials ===
Bedford School monitors are selected from amongst the boys of the Upper Sixth. They are entitled to wear coloured waistcoats and brown shoes as well as brass buttons on their blazers. The head of school and the deputy head are selected from amongst the monitors.

=== Colour system ===
Bedford School recognises individual achievement in various fields by the awarding of 'colours', at the discretion of the appropriate master, to boys in the Fifth Form and above. The various colours entitle the bearer to wear a particular variant of his uniform, appropriate to that award, on given days. There are five types of colours: Academic, Arts, Headmaster's, House, and Sports (Major and Minor).

== Extracurricular activities ==
=== Chapel Choir ===
The Chapel Choir sings the weekly and special services in Bedford School Chapel. The choir consists of eighteen choristers from the Preparatory School and twenty-four choral scholars from the Upper School, many of whom are former cathedral choristers.

The Chapel Choir regularly sings services and performs concerts in English cathedrals, including St Paul's Cathedral and Westminster Abbey. The choir also tours abroad in alternate years. Previous destinations have included: Prague(1998); Oslo (2000); Paris(2002), where the choir sang mass in Notre Dame Cathedral; Rome (2004), where the choir sang mass in St. Peter's Basilica; Ireland (2006); Madrid (2008), and Belgium (2019) .

The choir has made several recordings in recent years. In 2007, the BBC recorded the school's Festival of Nine Lessons and Carols for transmission on Christmas Day of that year on BBC Radio under the direction of Andrew Morris, Director of Music at Bedford School between 1979 and 2011.They also recorded a CD entitled "A Bedford Christmas" in 2018.

=== School magazines ===
Bedford School produces several magazines, of which the most prominent is The Ousel, published regularly since 1876. It is largely written by boys and managed directly by the school. It is published at the end of each Summer term and contains pupil and staff reviews of the school year. The school's Mosaic Society runs the Mosaic magazine which contains a range of essays and articles written by boys on subjects ranging from current affairs and politics to sport and science. In 2011, the Classical Society started a publication, VIM Magazine.

=== Sport ===
Bedford School has a different major sport for each term. The Christmas term is rugby union orientated, the Easter term is devoted to hockey, and Summer is the cricket season. Rowing with the Bedford School Boat Club takes place on the River Ouse throughout the year. Other popular Bedford School sports include athletics, badminton, basketball, canoeing, cross country running, fencing, fives, football, golf, rifle shooting, sailing, squash, swimming, table tennis, tennis, volleyball, water polo and weight training.

The school has produced cricketer Alastair Cook, who went on to captain the England cricket team, and whose coach at Bedford School was sports master and former England batsman Derek Randall. Other Bedford School sportsmen include England rugby internationals Martin Bayfield and Andy Gomarsall; the rower Jack Beresford, winner of five Olympic medals; and 1924 Olympic 100-metre sprint gold medallist Harold Abrahams.

== Headmasters ==
Edmund Greene was appointed headmaster of Bedford School before its foundation in 1552. From then on, the Wardens and Fellows of New College, Oxford, had the right to appoint the master (headmaster) and usher (deputy headmaster). This arrangement came to an end in 1903 with the appointment of John Edward King. The school's headmasters have been:

- 1548: Edmund Greene
- 1573: William Smyth
- 1577: Francis White
- 1587: Master Chambers
- 1597: Richard Butcher
- c. 1599: Henry Whitaker
- 1601: Robert Barker
- 1610: Daniel Gardener
- 1636: William Varney
- 1656: George Butler
- 1660: William Varney
- 1663: John Allanson
- 1665: John Butler
- 1672: John Longworth
- 1681: William Willis
- 1683: Nicholas Aspinall
- 1718: Matthew Priaulx
- 1739: George Bridle
- 1773: John Hooke
- 1810: William Stratford
- 1811: John Brereton
- 1855: Frederick Fanshawe
- 1874: James Surtees Phillpotts
- 1903: John Edward King
- 1910: Reginald Carter
- 1928: Humfrey Grose-Hodge
- 1951: Clarence Seaman
- 1955: William Brown
- 1975: Ian Jones
- 1986: Sidney Miller
- 1988: Michael Barlen
- 1990: Philip Evans
- 2008: John Moule
- 2014: James Hodgson
- 2026–present: Michael Sloan

== Notable staff ==
- Charles Abbot (1761–1817), Fellow of New College, Oxford, botanist and entomologist, Usher at Bedford School, 1787–1817
- Robert Steele (1860–1944), Medievalist
- W. H. D. Rouse (1863–1950), Fellow in Classics at Christ's College, Cambridge
- Stanley Toyne (1881–1962), Historian, Hampshire and MCC cricketer
- Jack Hobbs (1882–1963), Surrey and England cricketer
- Rex Alston (1901–1994), a master at Bedford School, 1924–1941, before becoming a BBC sports commentator
- Evelyn King (1907–1994), Labour MP, 1945–1950, Conservative MP, 1964–1979
- John Durnford-Slater (1909–1972), raised the first Commando unit in 1940, Estate Bursar and Commanding Officer of the CCF at Bedford School
- William Ronald Dalzell (1910–2004), book illustrator, author, and lecturer on the arts; art master, 1947-70
- Godfrey Brown (1915–1995), History master, Olympic gold medal winner, 1936
- Mary Midgley (1919–2018), moral philosopher
- Jack Bailey (1930–2018), Essex and MCC cricketer, Secretary of the MCC, 1974–1987
- Bernie Cotton (born 1948), Olympic hockey player, 1972, manager of the Great Britain Olympic hockey team, 1992
- Andrew Morris (born 1948), conductor and organist, Director of Music at Bedford School, 1979–2011
- Derek Randall (born 1951), Nottinghamshire and England cricketer
- Gary Steer (born 1970) Derbyshire County Cricket Club

== See also ==
- List of English and Welsh endowed schools (19th century)
- List of high schools producing multiple Olympic gold medalists
- List of the oldest schools in the United Kingdom
