= Edinburgh Academy =

Coordinates: 55.9608°N 3.2045°W

The Edinburgh Academy
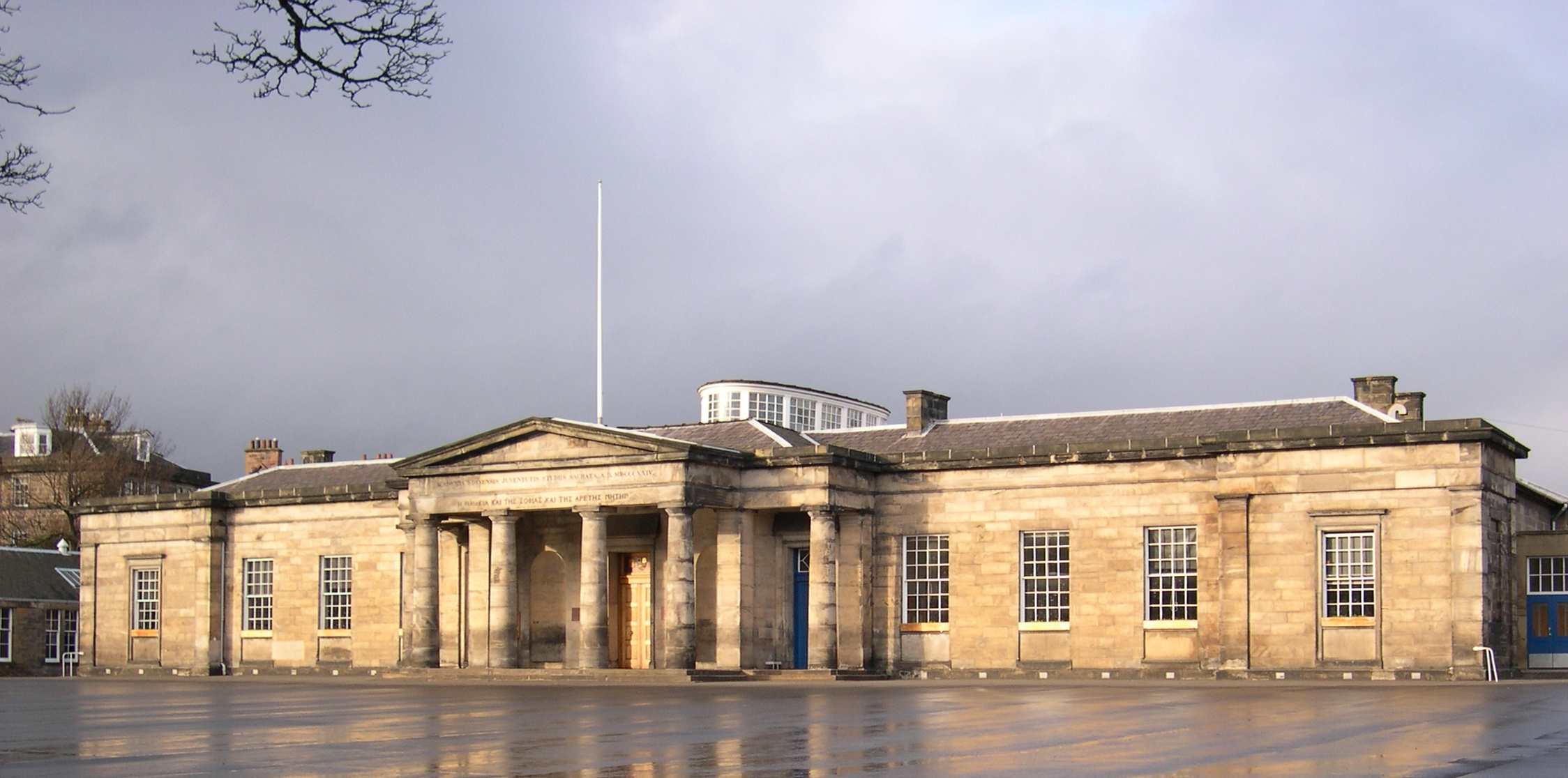

Location
- Henderson Row; Edinburgh, EH3 5BL; Scotland

Information
- Type: Private school Private school
- Motto: Αἰὲν ἀριστεύειν (Greek) (Always Excel)
- Established: 1824; 202 years ago
- Founders: Henry Cockburn, Leonard Horner and John Russell
- Local authority: City of Edinburgh
- Rector: Barry Welsh
- Gender: Mixed
- Age: 2 to 18
- Enrolment: 93 (Nursery); 372 (Junior School); 552 (Senior School)
- Houses: Carmichael; Cockburn; Houses (Dundas); Kinross
- Colours: Blue and White
- HMIE Reports: Report
- School Song: Floreat Academia (May the Academy flourish)
- Former Pupils: Edinburgh Academicals ("Accies")
- Website: www.edinburghacademy.org.uk

The Edinburgh Academy is a private day school in Edinburgh, Scotland, which was opened in 1824. The original building, on Henderson Row in Stockbridge, is now part of the Senior School. The Junior School is on Arboretum Road to the north of the city's Royal Botanic Garden.

In the latter half of the twentieth century there were many cases of physical and sexual abuse of pupils by Edinburgh Academy staff; in 2023 the Scottish Child Abuse Inquiry investigated numerous reports by ex-pupils of historical abuse by several staff; the Academy later issued an acknowledgement and apology. Several surviving staff members were found guilty in criminal trials, or Examinations of Facts ("trials of the facts") for those unfit to plead.

== Foundation ==
In 1822, the school's founders, Henry Cockburn and Leonard Horner, agreed that Edinburgh required a new school to promote classical learning. Edinburgh's Royal High School provided a classical education, but the founders felt that greater provision was needed for the teaching of Greek, to compete with some of England's public schools. Cockburn and Horner recruited John Russell as a co-founder and the three of them, together with other interested parties, put a proposal to the City Council for the building of a new school. The City Fathers gave their approval in 1823 and fifteen committee members were elected.

== Buildings ==
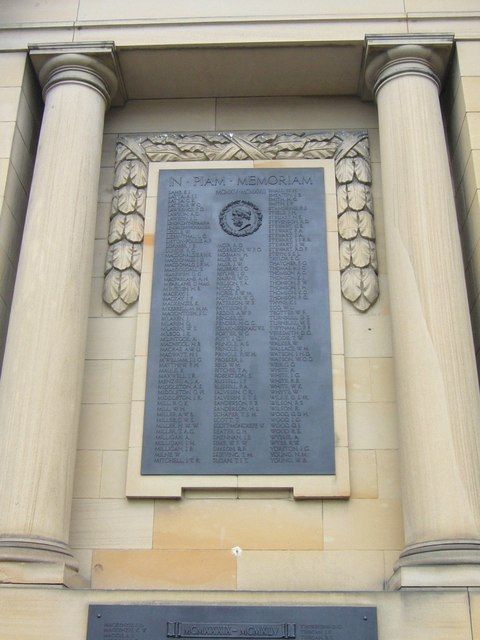
Edinburgh Academy War Memorial

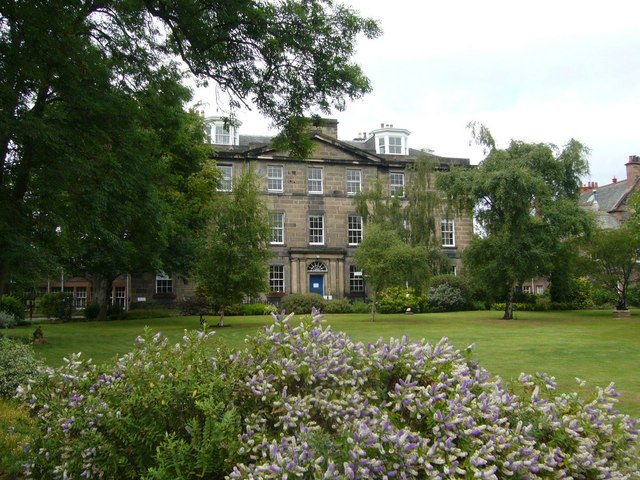
Donaldson's building, formerly the junior school of Donaldson's College

The main building of the Senior School, with its Greek Doric frontage, was designed by architect William Burn. The stone used was principally from the nearby Craigleith Quarry. The Foundation Stone was laid in June 1823 and the school opened for the first session in October 1824. In 1892, new classrooms were built along the western wall of the site, and in 1900, the School Library was opened, followed by the new Science Block in 1909, both along the eastern wall. At the back of the school the Dining Hall, and the Rifle Range beneath it, was opened in 1912 and after World War I, the Gymnasium was built. This was dedicated as a War Memorial to Edinburgh Academicals (former pupils) who had fallen during the hostilities of 1914 to 1918.

In 1945, a new building, Denham Green House, was acquired in the Trinity area of Edinburgh. This was used for the junior department (now known as Early Years) of the Preparatory School (now known as The Edinburgh Academy Junior School). In 1960, a new building for the upper three years of the Preparatory School was completed in Inverleith (Arboretum campus). Denham Green's nursery and early years facilities were relocated to purpose built accommodation on the Preparatory school's Arboretum campus in 1987. In 1992, the Rector's residence, Academy House and in 1997, a new Games Hall were constructed on the same campus. The latter was partly funded by money from The Lottery and Sports Council and is for the use not only of pupils in both parts of the school but also of the community in the area. A new computing and music building was completed at the Junior School in 2005 and a new nursery and after school facility in 2009.

At Henderson Row, the property next to the school, No 32, was acquired for administrative use in 1972 and in 1977, the Academy acquired the junior school of Donaldson's College, to the west. This allowed departments to expand and a purpose-built Music School was opened on this part of the campus in 1991. In 2005 the 1909 science block was demolished and a new science block, the James Clerk Maxwell Centre, named in honour of the 19th century scientist and former pupil, was opened by Lord Falconer of Thoroton on 3 November 2006.

== Teaching ==
The Edinburgh Academy was originally a day and boarding school for boys. It opened its primary school in 1960 and its nursery in 2009. While girls first arrived in the 1970s, it ceased boarding and transitioned to co-education in 2008 and is now a fully coeducational day school.

== Notable alumni ==
Former pupils of the Edinburgh Academy are known as Academicals, or Accies, a name shared with the associated rugby club.

Famous alumni of the school include Robert Louis Stevenson, James Clerk Maxwell, Nicky Campbell, Magnus Magnusson, Baron Falconer of Thoroton, Mike Blair, and Iain Glen. It has also produced one Nobel Prize winner (J. Michael Kosterlitz), numerous political and legal figures, several rugby internationals and nine recipients of the Victoria Cross; the highest number of any school in Scotland. According to the Sutton Trust, the school is placed second in Scotland and joint 36th in the UK for the number of the nation's leading people produced.

== Rectors ==
Rectors of The Edinburgh Academy since it was founded in 1824:

- 1824–1828: John Williams
- 1828–1829: Thomas Sheepshanks
- 1829–1847: John Williams, again
- 1847–1854: John Hannah
- 1854–1869: James Stephen Hodson
- 1869–1888: Thomas Harvey
- 1888–1901: Robert Mackenzie
- 1901–1910: Reginald Carter
- 1910–1926: Robert Ferard
- 1926–1931: Hugh Lyon
- 1931–1945: Lionel Smith
- 1945–1951: Clarence Seaman
- 1951–1962: Robert Watt
- 1962–1977: Herbert Mills
- 1977–1992: Laurence Ellis
- 1992–1995: John Rees
- 1995–2008: John Light
- 2008–2017: Marco Longmore
- Since 2017: Barry Welsh

== Other notable staff ==
- D'Arcy Wentworth Thompson, classicist, taught at the school from 1852 to 1863
- Arthur Pressland FRSE (1865–1934), educational theorist, linguist, schoolmaster and writer
- W. P. D. Wightman FRSE, Science Master from 1923 to 1951
- Jack Mendl (1911-2001), taught at the school from 1950 to 1977, also played cricket at first-class level
- James Burnet (b.1930), grandson of the renowned Scottish architect Sir John James Burnet, headmaster of the preparatory school from September 1973 until December 1987, under whose tenure his deputy John Brownlee practised much of the sadistic cruelty later confirmed in court.

== Abuse ==
In 2020 and 2021, six men accused a man later named as Iain Wares of physical and sexual abuse when they were pupils in the 1970s. The Scottish Crown Prosecution Service was initially reluctant to prosecute because of difficulties in seeking his extradition from South Africa, where he had moved, and his advanced age, but South Africa in 2020 approved the UK's request for extradition on six charges of lewd, indecent and libidinous practices and behaviour and one of indecent assault. In 2025 Wares was accused of a further 90 sex abuse charges.

On 27 July 2022, broadcaster Nicky Campbell disclosed that he had witnessed and experienced sexual and violent physical abuse while a pupil at the Edinburgh Academy in the 1970s. Alex Renton, a journalist investigating child abuse in private schools, reported that ex-pupils of Edinburgh Academy had named 17 other staff members, employed between the 1950s and 1980s, as physical and sexual abusers.

From 8 August 2023, the Scottish Child Abuse Inquiry (SCAI) hearings in Edinburgh, before Anne Smith, Lady Smith, took evidence from former pupils and members of staff of the Edinburgh Academy and medical experts. When actor Iain Glen spoke out about his abuse in 2002, "the wrath of Morningside and Muirfield and Murrayfield rained down on his head with biblical fury because he'd broken the code, the Edinburgh omertà".

On 30 November 2023, BBC1 broadcast a Panorama programme 'My Teacher the Abuser: Fighting for Justice', devoted to the history of abuse at the Edinburgh Academy and Fettes College. On 12 December 2023, Police Scotland announced that five former teaching staff aged between 69 and 90 had been arrested for questioning regarding alleged abuse incidents between 1968 and 1992, with one further individual to be referred to the authorities.

=== Abusers ===
- Hamish D. Dawson (1927-2009), teacher known for his "arbitrary and sadistic punishments"
- John W. Brownlee (b.1935), teacher deemed too unwell to stand trial who, on 27 March 2024, in an Examination of Facts at Edinburgh Sheriff Court, was found to have repeatedly committed a number of violent assaults against pupils
- John ('Jake') Young (b.1935), gym teacher deemed too unwell to stand trial who, on 11 August 2025, in an Examination of Facts at Edinburgh Sheriff Court, was found to have deliberately and gratuitously assaulted boys as young as 10
- Iain Wares (b.1939/40), teacher who moved to South Africa, but in August 2025 was facing prosecution for a case in South Africa, and also fighting extradition to Scotland to face several charges of sexual abuse
- William G. R. Bain (b.1953), teacher who, on 30 June 2025 at High Court of Justiciary in Glasgow, was sentenced to nine years' imprisonment for the sexual abuse of children at three different private boarding schools in Edinburgh, Aberdeen and Dumbarton

== See also ==
- List of schools in Edinburgh
- List of independent schools in Scotland
