= Philipp Gonon =

Swiss educationist

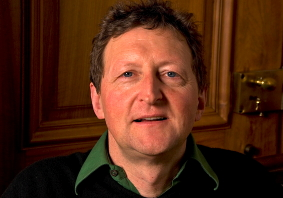
Philipp Gonon

Philipp C. Gonon (born 15 October 1955 in Flensburg, Germany) is a Swiss educationist with his main focus on vocational education and training studies and continuing education.

== Education and professorship ==
Gonon studied Law and Journalism from 1974 until 1976 at the University of Fribourg, Switzerland. Afterwards he continued studying Pedagogy at the University of Zurich, Switzerland, and at the Free University of Berlin, Germany. From 1986 until 1992 he became research assistant and lecturer at the Institute of Pedagogy of the University of Bern, Switzerland where he finished his postdoctoral lecture qualification in 1997. From 1999 until 2004, Gonon was appointed to Full University Professor at the Chair of Vocational and Operational Further Education at the University of Trier in Germany. Since 2004, Gonon has held the Chair of Vocational Education and Training and Vocational Teacher Training at the University of Zurich, Switzerland.

== Topics of research ==
Gonon has done research about Georg Kerschensteiner, the relation of schooling and vocation and about the European educational reforms. He specialised in the areas of historical and international comparative educational research. In addition, Gonon does research in quality assurance and evaluation, modularization in Vocational Education and he publishes about Philosophy and Theory of Vocational Education.

Philipp C. Gonon is co-editor of the Erziehungswissenschaftliche Revue" (online-journal), the journal Education permanente" and of the Series Education Studies in Vocational and Continuing Education" of the Peter Lang publishing house.

== Publications in English ==
- Berner, E. & Gonon, Ph. (2016). History of VET in Europe – Cases, Concepts and Challenges. Bern: Peter Lang.
- Hippach-Schneider, U., Weigel, T., Brown, A., Gonon, Ph. (2013). Are graduates preferred to those completing initial vocational education and training? Case studies on company recruitment strategies in Germany, England and Switzerland. Journal of Vocational Education & Training, 65, 1,1-17.
- Gonon, Ph. (2014). What makes the Dual System to a Dual System? A new Attempt to Define VET through a Governance Approach. bwp@, 25. Online: www.bwpat.de/ausgabe25/gonon_bwpat25.pdf.
- Maurer, M. & Gonon, Ph. (2014). The Challenges of Policy Transfer in Vocational Skills Development – National Qualifications Frameworks and the Dual Model of Vocational Training in International Cooperation. Berne: Peter Lang.
- Gonon, P. (2012). Georg Kerschensteiner and the Plea for Work-Oriented and Vocational Education – Germanys' Educational Debates in an Industrial Age. In Pilz, M. (Ed.), The Future of Vocational Education and Training in Changing World (285-303). Wiesbaden: VS Verlag & Springer.
- Gonon, P. (2012). Policy Borrowing and the Rise of Vocational and Education System – The Case of Switzerland. In Steiner-Khamsi, G. & Waldow, F. (Eds.), World Year Book of Education 2012 - Policy Borrowing and Lending in Education (191-205). Oxon, New York: Routledge.
- Gonon, P. (2012). Providing Evidence to improve Vocational Education and Training Policies – the Role of Research. In European Training Foundation (Ed.), ETF Yearbook 2012 – Evaluation and Monitoring of Vocational Education and Training Systems (129-134). Luxembourg: Publication Office of the European Union.
- Gonon, P. & Maurer, M. (2012). Education Policy Actors as Stakeholders in the Development of the Collective Skill System: The Case of Switzerland. In Busemeyer, M. R. & Trampusch, Ch. (Eds.), The Political Economy of Collective Skill Formation (126-149). Oxford: University Press.
- Hippach-Schneider, U., Weigel, T., Brown, A., Gonon, P. (2012). Are graduates preferred to those completing initial vocational education and training? Case studies on company recruitment strategies in Germany, England and Switzerland. Journal of Vocational Education & Training, DOI:10.1080/13636820.2012.727856.
- Stolz, S. & Gonon, P. (Eds.) (2012). Challenges and Reforms in Vocational Education – Aspects of Inclusion and Exclusion. Bern: Peter Lang.
- Stolz, S. & Gonon, P. (2012). Inclusion and Exclusion – A Challenge in the Context of Globalisation. In Stolz, S. & Gonon, Ph. (Eds.), Challenges and Reforms in Vocational Education – Aspects of Inclusion and Exclusion (9-27). Bern: Peter Lang.
- Gonon, P. (2011). Apprenticeship as a model for the international architecture of TVET. In Zhao, Z., Rauner, F. & Hauschildt, U. (Eds.), Assuring the Acquisition of Expertise – Apprenticeship in the Modern Economy (33-42). Beijing: Foreign Language Teaching and Research Press.
- Gonon, P., Hippach-Schneider, U. & Weigel, T. (2011). Globalization and apprenticeships – does apprenticeship survive in transnational companies? In Zhao, Z., Rauner, F. & Hauschildt U. (Eds.), Assuring the Acquisition of Expertise – Apprenticeship in the Modern Economy (83-86). Beijing: Foreign Language Teaching and Research Press.
- Maurer, M. Arnold, R., Gonon, P., Michaelowa, K. & Wieckenberg, U. (2011). Evaluators' Final Report. In Swiss Agency for Development and Cooperation (Ed.), Evaluation 2011/2: SDC's Vocational Skills Development Activities. Bern: Swiss Agency for Development and Cooperation.
- Gonon, P. (2009). Apprenticeship and Modern Vocational Education – the Rise of the German Dual System. In Rauner, F., Smith, E., Hauschildt, U. & Zelloth, H. (Eds.), Innovative Apprenticeships – Promoting Successful School-to-Work Transitions (213-216). Berlin: LIT.
- Gonon, P. (2009): 'Efficiency' and 'Vocationalism' as Structuring Principles of Industrial Education in the USA. Vocations and Learning, 2, 75–86.
- Gonon, P. (2009). Participative Quality Assurance. In Rauner, F. & Maclean, R. (Eds.), Handbook of Technical and Vocational Education and Training Research (833-839). Heidelberg: Springer.
- Gonon, P. (2009). The Internationalization of Vocational Education Reform-Concepts: A Rhetorical Perspective. In Heikkinen A. & Kraus, K. (Eds.), Reworking Vocational Education – Policies, Practices and Concepts (63-76). Bern: Peter Lang.
- Gonon, P. (2009). The Quest for Modern Vocational Education – Georg Kerschensteiner between Dewey, Weber and Simmel. Berne: P. Lang.
- with Wettstein, E. (2009). Berufsbildung in der Schweiz. Berne: hep-Verlag.
- Gonon, P. (2008). Apprenticeship, Vocationalism and Opposing VET-Reform Trends in Europe. In V. Aarkrog, & C. Helms Jorgensen (Eds.), Divergence and Convergence in Education and Work (p. 57-76). Berne: P. Lang.
- Gonon, P. (2006). A Short History of German Vocational Pedagogy. From Idealistic Classics to ‚Realistic' Research. In L. Mjelde, & R. Daly (Eds.), Working knowledge in a globalizing world: From work to learning, from learning to work (p. 197-212). Berne: P. Lang.
- Gonon, P. (2005). Dewey and James in Germany - Missed Opportunities in German Pedagogy for Creative Encounter with American Pragmatism. In D. Tröhler, & J. Oelkers (Eds.), Pragmatism and Education (p. 69-94). Rotterdam: Sense Publishers.
- Gonon, P (2004). Convergence of Discourses – Convergences of Structures? The reform of Vocational Education in England and Switzerland in the Light of the European Integration. In A. Lindgren, & A. Heikkinen (Eds.), Social competences in vocational and continuing education (p. 199-214). Bern: Peter Lang.
- Gonon, P. (2004). The dynamics of vocational training and innovation in Switzerland. In Cedefop (Eds.), Toward a history of vocational education and training (VET) in Europe in a comparative perspective (p. 88-99). Luxemburg.
- Gonon, P. (2004). Travel and Reform. In D. Phillips, & K. Ochs (Eds.), Educational Policy Borrowing: Historical perspectives (p. 125-144). Oxford Studies in Comparative Education. Oxford: Symposium Books.
- Gonon, P. (2001). Young Women in Swiss Vocational Education and in Business matura (school Leaving Examination). In. P. Gonon, K. Haefeli, A. Heikkinen, & I. Ludwig (Eds.), Gender Perspectives on Vocational Education – Historical, Cultural and Policy Aspects (p. 57-72). Bern: Peter Lang.
- with Borkowsky, A. (1998). Switzerland. In. OECD (ed.), Pathways and Participation in Vocational and Technical Education and Training (p. 335-374). Paris. OECD.
- Gonon, P. (1997). The pathway approach to VET: the Case of Switzerland. In A. Heikkinen & R. G. Sultana (Ed.), Vocational Education and Apprenticeships in Europe – Challenges for Practice and Research (p. 177-199). Tampere: Yliopisto.
- Gonon, P. (1994). Kerschensteiner and Education. In T. Husen & T. N. Postlethwaite (Ed.), The international Encyclopedia of Education (Vol. 6, pp. 3133–3138). Second Edition. Oxford: Pergamon.

== Memberships in Organisations ==
- VET & Culture, VETNET, INAP, Section BWP of DGFE, SGAB
