= Philip Evans (headmaster) =

British educationalist

Ian Philip Evans OBE FRSC (born 1948) is a British educationalist and a former Headmaster of Bedford School.

== Biography ==
Born on 2 May 1948 and educated in North Wales at Ruabon Grammar School, Evans read Natural Sciences at Churchill College, Cambridge taking a first class degree and obtained a doctorate in inorganic chemistry from Imperial College London, working in the laboratory of Professor Sir Geoffrey Wilkinson. He taught chemistry at St Paul's School, London and, in 1991, he was appointed as Headmaster of Bedford School, a position which he held until the summer of 2008. He was also appointed as a government advisor on education, from which post he retired in 1999, and was subsequently awarded an OBE for his work. He was an appointed member of the council of the Royal Society of Chemistry.

== Publications ==
- I. P. Evans, A. Spencer, & G. Wilkinson "Dichlorotetrakis(dimethyl sulfoxide)ruthenium(II) and its use as a source material for new ruthenium(II) complexes" Jrnl. Chem. Soc. Dalton Trans. (1973) 204-209
