= SS Alexander E. Brown =

World War II Liberty ship of the United States

History

United States
- Name: Alexander E. Brown
- Namesake: Alexander E. Brown
- Owner: War Shipping Administration (WSA)
- Operator: South Atlantic Steamship Lines Inc.
- Ordered: as type (EC2-S-C1) hull, MC hull 2321
- Builder: J.A. Jones Construction, Panama City, Florida
- Cost: $946,063
- Yard number: 62
- Way number: 1
- Laid down: 18 August 1944
- Launched: 28 September 1944
- Sponsored by: Mrs. Robert Jones Sister
- Completed: 13 October 1944
- Identification: Call sign: KSYW
- Fate: Sold for commercial use, 23 December 1946, withdrawn from fleet, 27 December 1946

Greece
- Name: Michalakis
- Owner: Nicholas Eustathiou (1946–1958); Memphis Maritime Co. (1958–1963)
- Operator: Compania de Navegacion Phoceana de Panama
- Fate: Sold, 1963

Panama
- Name: Georgakis
- Owner: P. Wigham Richardson & Co.
- Operator: Nimor Corporation
- Fate: Sold, 1965

Panama
- Name: Humboldt
- Owner: Consorcio Naviero
- Operator: Compania de Navegacion Limar de Panama
- Fate: Sold, 1967

Peru
- Name: Humboldt
- Owner: Transmar S.A.
- Operator: Compania de Navegacion Limar de Panama
- Fate: Scrapped, 1967

General characteristics
- Class & type: Liberty ship; type EC2-S-C1, standard
- Tonnage: 10,865 LT DWT; 7,176 GRT
- Displacement: 3,380 long tons (3,434 t) (light); 14,245 long tons (14,474 t) (max)
- Length: 441 feet 6 inches (135 m) oa; 416 feet (127 m) pp; 427 feet (130 m) lwl
- Beam: 57 feet (17 m)
- Draft: 27 ft 9.25 in (8.4646 m)
- Installed power: 2 × Oil fired 450 °F (232 °C) boilers, operating at 220 psi (1,500 kPa); 2,500 hp (1,900 kW)
- Propulsion: 1 × triple-expansion steam engine, (manufactured by Filer and Stowell, Milwaukee, Wisconsin); 1 × screw propeller
- Speed: 11.5 knots (21.3 km/h; 13.2 mph)
- Capacity: 562,608 cubic feet (15,931 m^{3}) (grain); 499,573 cubic feet (14,146 m^{3}) (bale)
- Complement: 38–62 USMM; 21–40 USNAG
- Armament: Varied by ship; Bow-mounted 3-inch (76 mm)/50-caliber gun; Stern-mounted 4-inch (102 mm)/50-caliber gun; 2–8 × single 20-millimeter (0.79 in) Oerlikon anti-aircraft (AA) cannons and/or, 2–8 × 37-millimeter (1.46 in) M1 AA guns

SS Alexander E. Brown was a Liberty ship built in the United States during World War II. She was named after Alexander E. Brown.

== Construction ==
Alexander E. Brown was laid down on 18 August 1944, under a Maritime Commission (MARCOM) contract, MC hull 2321, by J.A. Jones Construction, Panama City, Florida; sponsored by Mrs. Robert Jones Sister, sister-in-law of Raymond A. Jones, vice president and general manager, JAJCC, and launched on 28 September 1944.

== History ==
She was allocated to South Atlantic Steamship Lines Inc., 13 October 1944. On 5 June 1946, she was laid up in the James River Reserve Fleet, Lee Hall, Virginia, 5 June 1946.

She was sold, on 23 December 1946, to Nicholas Eustathiou, for $565,691.07 and commercial use. She was flagged in Greece and renamed Michalakis. She was withdrawn from the fleet on 27 December 1946.

== Bibliography ==
- "Jones Construction, Panama City FL". www.ShipbuildingHistory.com. 13 October 2010.
- Maritime Administration. "Alexander E. Brown". Ship History Database Vessel Status Card. U.S. Department of Transportation, Maritime Administration. This article incorporates text from this source, which is in the public domain.
- Davies, James (May 2004). "Specifications (As-Built)" (PDF). p. 23.
- "SS Alexander E. Brown".
