= Chequered skipper =

Chequered skipper could refer to any of the following butterfly species:

- Carterocephalus palaemon also known as arctic skipper
- Large chequered skipper, Heteropterus morpheus
- Kedestes lepenula
