= Georg Kerschensteiner =

German educational theorist (1854–1932)

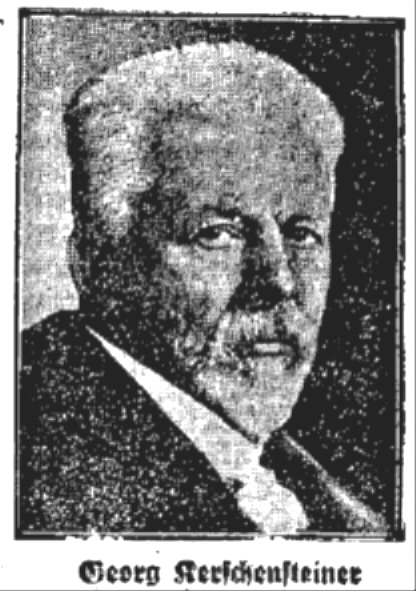
Kerschensteiner

Georg Michael Anton Kerschensteiner (29 July 1854 in Munich – 15 January 1932 in Munich) was a German professor and educational theorist. He was director of public schools in Munich from 1895 to 1919 and became a professor at the Ludwig-Maximilians-Universität München in 1920. The author of Theorie der Bildungsorganisation (1933), Kerschensteiner is primarily known for developing a pragmatic approach to education, which included the integration of academic study with physical activity and the establishment of a network of vocational schools.
