= C. E. Lipe Machine Shop =

- Company type: Machine shop
- Industry: Machinery, experimental
- Founded: 1880
- Headquarters: Syracuse, New York
- Key people: Charles E. Lipe (1850–1895), Alexander T. Brown
- Products: Machinery, experimental

The C. E. Lipe Machine Shop was established in Syracuse, New York, in 1880 in the Lynch Building by Charles E. Lipe (1850–1895), a mechanical engineer. The building became an early industrial incubator and was commonly known as the Lipe Shop. While Lipe worked on his own ideas, he rented out facilities to others. Some of the leaders in industry worked both independently and side by side in this building to solve the industrial problems of their era. "These men sowed the germs that sprouted into major business enterprises in Syracuse and elsewhere" and for many years the machine shop was known as the "cradle of Syracuse industries."

The building is still in use today as a hardware store.
