= Sandy Brown =

Sandy Brown may refer to:

- Sandy Brown (cricketer) (born 1950), Scottish cricketer
- Sandy Brown (footballer, born 1877) (1877–1944), Scottish footballer
- Sandy Brown (footballer, born 1939) (1939–2014), Scottish footballer (Partick Thistle, Everton)
- Sandy Brown (musician) (1929–1975), Scottish clarinettist
- Sandy brown (color), a colour and shade of brown
- Sandy Brown (ceramist) (born 1946), British ceramist
- Sandy Brown (writer) (born 1957), American travel writer

== See also ==
- Alexander Brown (disambiguation)
- Sandra Brown (disambiguation)
- Sanford Brown (disambiguation)
