= Alex Browne =

Australian rules footballer (born 1992)

Personal information
- Full name: Alex Browne
- Born: 9 August 1992 (age 34)
- Original team: Oakleigh Chargers (TAC Cup)/Xavier College
- Draft: No. 48, 2010 National Draft
- Height: 187 cm (6 ft 2 in)
- Weight: 85 kg (187 lb)
- Position: Defender

Playing career^{1}
Years	Club	Games (Goals)
2011–2015	Essendon	11 (4)
- ^{1} Playing statistics correct to the end of 2015.

Alex Browne (born 9 August 1992) is a former professional Australian rules footballer who played for the Essendon Football Club in the Australian Football League (AFL). Browne played for the Oakleigh Chargers in the TAC Cup. He was drafted by Essendon with pick 48 in the 2010 national draft and made his debut against Melbourne at the Melbourne Cricket Ground in round 11 of the 2011 AFL season. He was delisted in October 2015.

His father, Murray Browne, played for Collingwood and Fitzroy in the 1980s and his mother was a cheerleader for Carlton.

Browne, along with 33 other Essendon players, was found guilty of using a banned performance-enhancing substance, thymosin beta-4, as part of Essendon's sports supplements program during the 2012 season. He and his teammates were initially found not guilty in March 2015 by the AFL Anti-Doping Tribunal, but a guilty verdict was returned in January 2016 after an appeal by the World Anti-Doping Agency. He was suspended for two years which, with backdating, ended in November 2016; as a result, he served approximately fourteen months of his suspension.

Browne had signed for the Northern Blues in the Victorian Football League for the 2016 season before his suspension ended his 2016 season.

== Statistics ==
Legend
G	Goals	K	Kicks	D	Disposals	T	Tackles
B	Behinds	H	Handballs	M	Marks

Season	Team	No.	Games	Totals							Averages (per game)							Votes
Season	Team	No.	Games	G	B	K	H	D	M	T	G	B	K	H	D	M	T	Votes
2011	Essendon	24	2	0	0	4	4	8	1	3	0.0	0.0	2.0	2.0	4.0	0.5	1.5	0
2012	Essendon	24	6	3	2	45	37	82	19	7	0.5	0.3	7.5	6.2	13.7	3.2	1.2	0
2013	Essendon	24	–	–	–	–	–	–	–	–	–	–	–	–	–	–	–	0
2014	Essendon	24	–	–	–	–	–	–	–	–	–	–	–	–	–	–	–	0
2015	Essendon	24	3	1	0	15	12	27	9	4	0.3	0.0	5.0	4.0	9.0	3.0	1.3	0
Career			11	4	2	64	53	117	29	14	0.4	0.2	5.8	4.8	10.6	2.6	1.3	0
