= Isaac Brown House =

- U.S. National Register of Historic Places
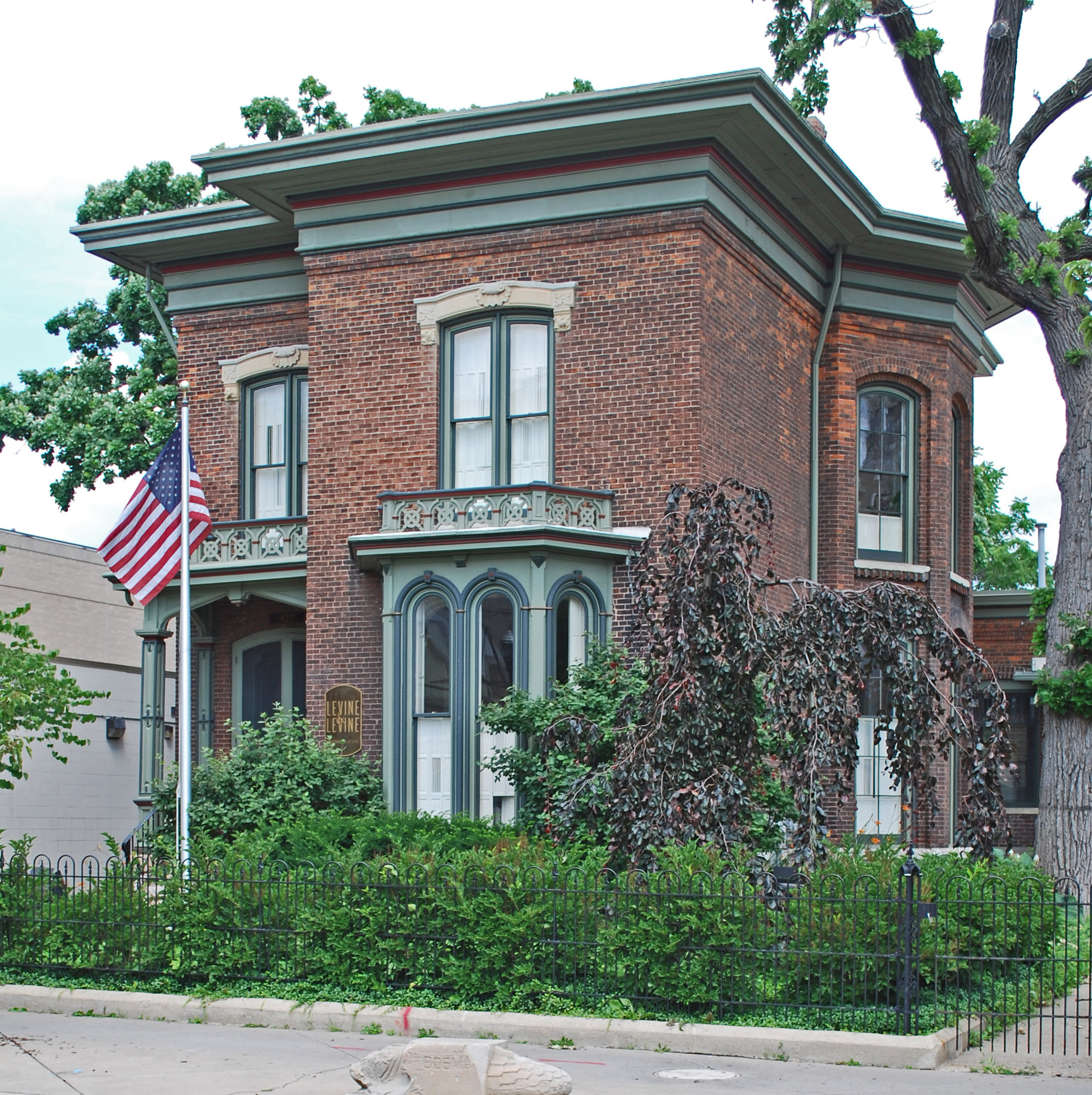
- Interactive map
- Location: 427 S. Burdick St., Kalamazoo, Michigan
- Coordinates: 42°17′17″N 85°34′58″W
- Area: less than one acre
- Built: 1867
- Architectural style: Italianate
- MPS: Kalamazoo MRA
- NRHP reference No.: 83000856
- Added to NRHP: May 27, 1983

The Isaac Brown House is a single-family home located at 427 South Burdick Street in Kalamazoo, Michigan. It was listed on the National Register of Historic Places in 1983.

== History ==
Isaac A. Brown was born in Windsor County, Vermont, in 1817. He married in about 1842. In 1847 he traveled to California as part of the California Gold Rush. However, Brown failed to strike it rich, and moved on to become an agent for the Rutland and Burlington Railroad in Vermont. He arrived in Kalamazoo in 1862, and began work as a loan agent for eastern firms and as a real estate dealer. He later sold insurance, speculated in real estate, and became a well-known local businessman. He slowly amassed a respectable fortune, and financed several downtown blocks. In 1867, Brown had this home built for his family in what was at the time a fashionable neighborhood near the downtown. He lived in it until his death in 1904.

The house was later the residence and of Dr. John W. Bosman, the Chief Resident of Bronson Hospital. Bosman also ran his medical practice from the house. It was also used to house a law firm.

== Description ==
The Brown House is a narrow and square two-story Italianate structure. The front facade has an L-shape, with a small entrance porch located in the angle of the L. The facade contains a bay window with tall, narrow, round-headed windows accented with heavy moldings. Other windows in the front are paired, with limestone lintels carved with seashell and leaf motifs. The entrance porch is supported by square posts on paneled bases, and arched openings between. The porch and the bay window both have small iron railings at their roofline. The front entrance is through double doors.
