= Curtis Don Brown =

American serial killer and rapist

- Born: August 2, 1958 (age 68); U.S.
- Conviction: Murder (3 counts)
- Penalty: Life imprisonment

Details
- Victims: 3–18+
- Span of crimes: 1985–1986
- Country: United States
- State: Texas
- Date apprehended: April 14, 1987

Curtis Don Brown (born August 2, 1958) is an American serial killer and rapist who raped and murdered three women around Arlington and Fort Worth, Texas, between 1985 and 1986, though he is suspected of up to 18 murders. Convicted of one murder in 1987, in 2009 he was convicted of the two additional murders from 1985, based on results of DNA profiling.

== Life ==
Brown was born on August 2, 1958. At 13-years of age, Brown narrowly escaped a house fire that killed his two younger siblings, and injured his mother. Afterwards, he began to act out on worrying behavior. In the early 1980s, he moved to Texas to live close to his mother.

On May 28, 1986, Brown was arrested for, and later charged with, the murder of 51-year-old Jewel Woods. Woods, a former Fort Worth nurse, was raped and bludgeoned to death just outside of her Fort Worth home. Brown was spotted fleeing the scene by officers who were scouting the area for an unrelated matter. When stopped, he was out of breath having run just under a mile, and was found to be in possession of Woods’ purse. In 1989, Brown was found guilty of killing Woods and was sentenced to life imprisonment.

== Investigation ==
In 2005, due to a newly formed prison precondition, Brown was required to submit a sample of his DNA to be run in the crime lab. Later that year, when the tests were completed, Fort Worth Cold Case detectives contacted Arlington Cold Case detectives to share information. Brown's DNA profile corresponded with physical evidence found on two 1985 murder victims whose deaths had up to that point been unsolved. They were 29-year-old Terece Gregory and 18-year-old Sharyn Kills Back, whose bodies were found in Arlington and Fort Worth between March and May 1985.

The first of these was Sharyn Kills Back, whose body was found on March 23, 1985, by a plumber inside a storm drain in Southern Arlington. She had a rope tied around her neck, indicating strangulation as a lead cause of death. Kills Back had gone missing eight days prior on March 15. On May 30, 1985, the nude body of Gregory was found floating in the Trinity River in Fort Worth. She was last seen the previous day, after leaving a downtown nightclub. After examining her body, it was determined she had been raped and shot, and DNA from the perpetrator was found in her body, and was later collected.

== Conviction ==
Following this, Brown was indicted on capital murder charges for the Gregory killing, and soon was further charged in Kills Back's killing. In 2009, based upon the result of a plea agreement, Brown pleaded guilty to the two additional murders to avoid the death penalty, and was subsequently given two life sentences without the possibility of parole to run concurrently. Investigators hypothesize that Brown had been responsible for 18 other murders that started back in 1984. No new charges have been filed.

== See also ==
- List of serial killers in the United States
