= Deaths in April 2014 =

The following is a list of notable deaths in April 2014.

Entries for each day are listed alphabetically by surname. A typical entry lists information in the following sequence:

- Name, age, country of citizenship and reason for notability, established cause of death, reference.

== April 2014 ==
=== 1 ===
- Bai Dongcai, 98, Chinese politician.
- Andreas Bjørkum, 82, Norwegian philologist.
- Anker Buch, 74, Danish violinist.
- Pierre Capretz, 89, French linguist and academic, creator of French in Action series.
- Melissa Minnich Coleman, 96, American architect.
- Guillermo Delgado, 83, Peruvian footballer.
- King Fleming, 91, American jazz pianist, natural causes.
- Essie Garrett, 74, American ultramarathon runner.
- Rudolph Hargrave, 89, American judge, member of the Oklahoma Supreme Court (1978–2010), Chief Justice (1989–1990, 2001–2002).
- Jacques Le Goff, 90, French historian.
- Robert P. Madden, 86, American spectroscopist.
- Andrew Joseph McDonald, 90, American Roman Catholic prelate, Bishop of Little Rock (1972–2000).
- Bill Mitchell, 85, Canadian ice hockey player (Detroit Red Wings), kidney failure.
- Carlos Oneto, 84, Peruvian actor and comic.
- Merimeri Penfold, 93, New Zealand Māori language academic (University of Auckland), cancer.
- Rolf Rendtorff, 88, German academic, Emeritus Professor of Old Testament (University of Heidelberg).
- Harry Rowe, 89, Australian footballer and cricketer.
- Colin Scott, 80, British Anglican prelate, Bishop of Hulme (1984–1998).
- John W. Shelton, 85, American politician, member of the West Virginia House of Delegates (1995–2004).
- Alida van der Anker-Doedens, 91, Dutch Olympic silver-medalist sprint canoer (1948).
- Keane Wallis-Bennett, 12, British student, crushed in wall collapse.
- Norman Warner, 70, Canadian politician and insurance broker, cancer.

=== 2 ===
- Taha Basry, 67, Egyptian football player and manager.
- Ibrahim Bin Shakaran, 34, Moroccan militant, shot.
- Richard Brick, 68, American film producer (Deconstructing Harry) and executive, New York City Film Commissioner (1992–1994), esophageal cancer.
- Stephanie Camp, 46, American historian, cancer.
- Robert Clodius, 93, American academic.
- Everett De Roche, 67, Australian screenwriter, cancer.
- Harris Goldsmith, 77, American pianist and critic.
- Sandy Grossman, 78, American sports director (CBS Sports, Fox Sports), directed 10 Super Bowls, cancer.
- Lyndsie Holland, 75, English opera singer and actress.
- Lucy Hood, 56, American television executive (News Corporation), President of the Academy of Television Arts & Sciences (since 2013), cancer.
- Glyn Jones, 82, South African writer and actor.
- Mamoon Kazi, 78, Pakistani judge, member of the Supreme Court (1997–2000) and Sindh High Court (1985–1997).
- Willi Kafel, 83, Austrian Olympic gymnast.
- Michael Pearse Lacey, 97, Canadian Roman Catholic prelate, Auxiliary Bishop of Toronto (1979–1993).
- Allan Lindsay, 88, British Olympic athlete.
- Miloš Mikeln, 83, Slovene writer.
- Consuelo Moure, 67, Colombian actress, lung cancer.
- Carl Epting Mundy Jr., 78, American military officer, Commandant of the Marine Corps and member of the Joint Chiefs of Staff (1991–1995), Merkel cell carcinoma.
- Alfred Niepieklo, 86, German footballer.
- Mary Lou Petty, 98, American Olympic swimmer (1936).
- Unnikrishnan Puthur, 80, Indian novelist.
- Gustavo Rodríguez, 67, Venezuelan film, stage and television actor.
- Vern Rutsala, 80, American author and poet.
- Alieu Badara Saja Taal, 70, Gambian academic and newspaper executive, managing director of The Daily Observer, liver infection.
- Mahjoub Sharif, 66, Sudanese poet and activist.
- David Werdyger, 94, Polish-born American Hasidic singer.
- Urs Widmer, 75, Swiss author.

=== 3 ===
- Joseph Archibald, 80, Kittitian-born British Virgin Islander jurist, member of the Eastern Caribbean Supreme Court.
- Andrei Bodiu, 48, Romanian poet.
- Máximo Cajal López, 79, Spanish diplomat.
- Régine Deforges, 78, French author, editor, director and playwright.
- Akira Endo, 75, Japanese-born American conductor.
- Pedro Fré, 89, Brazilian Roman Catholic prelate, Bishop of Corumbá (1985–1989) and Barretos (1989–2000).
- Edvard Grimstad, 81, Norwegian politician, MP for Østfold (1989–1997), Governor of Østfold (1998–2003).
- Norval Horner, 83, Canadian politician, MP for Battleford—Kindersley (1972–1974).
- Fred Kida, 93, American cartoonist.
- Virginie Korte-van Hemel, 84, Dutch politician, Deputy Minister of Justice (1982–1989).
- Paul Lüönd, 63, Swiss musician and politician.
- Jovan Pavlović, 77, Serbian Orthodox prelate, Metropolitan Bishop of Zagreb, Ljubljana and Italy.
- Prince Michael of Prussia, 74, German author.
- Heribert Reitböck, 80, Austrian neuroscientist.
- John Ryan, 86, Irish politician, Leas-Cheann Comhairle (1982–1987).
- Paul Salamunovich, 86, American choral director (Los Angeles Master Chorale) and film conductor (Dracula), complications from West Nile virus.
- Tommy Lynn Sells, 49, American serial killer, execution by lethal injection.
- Arthur Smith, 93, American musician and songwriter ("Guitar Boogie", "Dueling Banjos").
- Ed Spencer, 85, American race car driver.
- Dame Dorothy Winstone, 95, New Zealand educationalist and academic.

=== 4 ===
- José Aguilar, 55, Cuban Olympic bronze-medalist light-welterweight boxer (1980), cerebral infarction.
- Len Ardill, 83, Australian politician, member of the Queensland Legislative Assembly for Salisbury (1986–1992) and Archerfield (1992–1998).
- İsmet Atlı, 83, Turkish Olympic champion light heavyweight freestyle wrestler (1960).
- James Bates, 61, American conductor.
- Dave Blakey, 84, English footballer (Chesterfield).
- William W. Blanton, 90, American politician, member of the Texas House of Representatives (1976–1988), pneumonia.
- Archie Boyd, 95, English Royal Air Force officer.
- Eleanor de Freitas, 23, English suspect in criminal proceedings, suicide by hanging.
- Willie Duggan, 88, Irish Olympic boxer.
- Kumba Ialá, 61, Bissau-Guinean politician, President (2000–2003), cardiopulmonary arrest.
- Charles Jordan, 76, American politician.
- Peter Liechti, 63, Swiss filmmaker.
- Margo MacDonald, 70, Scottish politician, MP for Glasgow Govan (1973–1974), MSP for Lothian (since 1999), Parkinson's disease.
- Klaus Meyer, 76, German footballer.
- Anja Niedringhaus, 48, German photojournalist (Associated Press), Pulitzer Prize winner for Breaking News Photography (2005), shot.
- Curtis Bill Pepper, 96, American journalist (Newsweek) and author.
- Muhammad Qutb, 95, Egyptian Islamist author and academic.
- Emma Reed, 88, American Olympic athlete.
- Alberta Jones Seaton, 89, American zoologist.
- Richard Small, 68, American racehorse trainer (Concern), cancer.
- Gyula Szabó, 83, Hungarian actor.
- Lois Wallace, 73, American literary agent, lung cancer.

=== 5 ===
- Azamour, 13, Irish racehorse and sire, euthanised.
- Óscar Avilés, 90, Peruvian guitarist and singer.
- Poul Erik Bech, 76, Danish football manager.
- Willis Blair, 90, Canadian politician, Mayor of East York (1973–1975).
- Andy Davidson, 81, Scottish footballer (Hull City).
- Alan Davie, 93, Scottish painter and musician.
- Mariano Díaz, 74, Spanish Olympic racing cyclist.
- Antonio Díaz Gil, 79, Spanish footballer.
- Rolv Enge, 92, Norwegian resistance member and architect.
- Stuart Fullerton, 74, American entomologist (University of Central Florida).
- Leif Haanes, 81, Norwegian ship-owner and Christian leader.
- Wayne Henderson, 74, American jazz trombonist (The Jazz Crusaders) and record producer, heart failure.
- Rhondda Alder Kelly, 87, Australian model, Miss Australia (1946).
- Peter Matthiessen, 86, American author (At Play in the Fields of the Lord, The Snow Leopard), leukemia.
- L. B. McGinnis, 72, American novelist.
- Stanislaus Okurut, 84, Ugandan politician, Minister of Labour, Sports and Transport, heart failure.
- John Pinette, 50, American comedian and actor (Parker Lewis Can't Lose, The Punisher, Junior), pulmonary embolism.
- Gordon Smith, 59, Scottish footballer (St Johnstone, Aston Villa).
- Yvonne Stoffel-Wagener, 82, Luxembourgish Olympic gymnast.
- Peter Thorne, 90, English fighter pilot and diplomat.
- Ralph H. Turner, 94, American sociologist.
- José Wilker, 66, Brazilian actor (Medicine Man) and director, heart attack.

=== 6 ===
- Mary Anderson, 96, American actress (Gone With the Wind).
- Jacques Castérède, 87, French composer.
- Leee Black Childers, 68, American punk rock and art photographer (The Factory, Andy Warhol).
- Liv Dommersnes, 91, Norwegian actress.
- Sir Maurice Drake, 91, British judge of the High Court of England and Wales.
- Charles Farthing, 60, New Zealand doctor, heart attack.
- Peter Kaberere, 30, Kenyan gospel singer, electrocuted.
- Erzsi Kovács, 85, Hungarian pop singer and performer.
- Domenico Mennitti, 75, Italian politician, Mayor of Brindisi (2004–2011).
- Mickey Rooney, 93, American actor (The Black Stallion, Breakfast at Tiffany's, It's a Mad, Mad, Mad, Mad World), Emmy winner (1982), natural causes.
- Leandro Rovirosa Wade, 96, Mexican politician and engineer, Governor of Tabasco (1977–1982).
- Farhad Sepahbody, 85, Iranian exiled diplomat, Ambassador to Morocco (1976–1979).
- Chuck Stone, 89, American navigator, journalist and academic, Tuskegee Airman during World War II, co-founder of the NABJ.
- Massimo Tamburini, 70, Italian motorcycle designer (Ducati 916, MV Agusta F4), lung cancer.
- Van Vlahakis, 79, Greek-born American chemist.

=== 7 ===
- Andrei Aleksenko, 80, Russian scientist.
- Ron Barkhouse, 87, Canadian politician.
- Kevin Bokeili, 51, French science fiction writer.
- Ashish Bose, 83, Indian demographer, coined "BIMARU" term, fall.
- Claudine Bouché, 88, French film editor (Shoot the Piano Player, Jules and Jim).
- George Dureau, 83, American painter and photographer, Alzheimer's disease.
- Peaches Geldof, 25, English television presenter, writer and model, heroin overdose.
- Sandy Green, 88, British mathematician.
- Alexandre Guyodo, 91, French Olympic steeplechaser (1948).
- Géza Henni, 87, Hungarian Olympic footballer.
- Xaver Höger, 84, German Olympic athlete.
- Robert Hull, 68, American architect, stroke.
- Noel Knockwood, 81, Canadian Mi'kmaq spiritual leader and civil servant, Sergeant-at-Arms for Legislative Assembly of Nova Scotia (2000–2005), National Aboriginal Achievement Award (2002), stroke.
- Ernest Kurnow, 101, American academic.
- V. K. Murthy, 90, Indian cinematographer (Kaagaz Ke Phool, Pyaasa, Sahib Bibi Aur Ghulam), recipient of the Dadasaheb Phalke Award (2008).
- Perlita Neilson, 80, British actress.
- Zeituni Onyango, 61, Kenyan computer programmer, involved in immigration case during 2008 US presidential election campaign, breast cancer and respiratory ailments.
- Jack Satter, 92, American philanthropist, partly owned the New York Yankees.
- Jerry Sharkey, 71, American Wright brothers historian, conceived idea for Dayton Aviation Heritage National Historical Park, heart failure.
- John Shirley-Quirk, 82, English bass-baritone opera singer, cancer.
- George Shuffler, 88, American Hall of Fame bluegrass musician (The Stanley Brothers).
- Steve Smith, 64, American politician, member of the Minnesota House of Representatives (1999–2012).
- Josep Maria Subirachs, 87, Spanish Catalan sculptor and painter, Parkinson's disease.
- Scato Swu, 90, Indian politician.
- Frans van der Lugt, 75, Dutch Jesuit priest, shot.
- Čedo Vuković, 93, Montenegrin writer.
- Royce Waltman, 72, American college basketball coach (Indiana State).
- Emilio Yap, 88, Filipino businessman and philanthropist.

=== 8 ===
- Starla Brodie, 58, American poker player.
- Jim W. Brown, 87, Australian footballer.
- Sandy Brown, 75, Scottish footballer (Everton).
- Emmanuel III Delly, 86, Iraqi Chaldean Catholic hierarch, Patriarch of Babylon (2003–2012).
- Karlheinz Deschner, 89, German writer and activist.
- Robert Dickson, 88, Australian architect.
- Shrish Chandra Dikshit, 91, Indian politician, MP for Varanasi (1991–1996), DGP for Uttar Pradesh.
- Charles Anthony Fager, 90, Bahamian neurosurgeon.
- Jay R. Galbraith, 75, American organizational theorist.
- Phil Hardy, 69, British film and music journalist.
- Eric Harroun, 31, American jihadist, drug overdose.
- Andrew Intamba, 67, Namibian diplomat and security director, first Ambassador to Egypt (since 2008), Director of the Central Intelligence Service (1991–2007).
- Art Kimball, 72, American politician, member of the Utah Senate (1977–1981).
- Ghiță Licu, 68, Romanian Olympic bronze and silver medallist handball player (1972, 1976).
- Ivan Mercep, 84, New Zealand architect (Museum of New Zealand Te Papa Tongarewa).
- Monte Olsen, 57, American politician, member of the Wyoming House of Representatives (2002–2008), myocardial ischemia.
- Herbert Schoen, 84, German footballer.
- Cornelius Taiwo, 103, Nigerian academic.
- Ultimate Warrior, 54, American Hall of Fame professional wrestler (WWF, WCW), heart attack.
- Adrianne Wadewitz, 37, American scholar, rockclimbing fall.

=== 9 ===
- Manuel Alejandro Aponte Gómez, 43, Mexican bodyguard (Joaquín Guzmán Loera), shot.
- Python Anghelo, 59, Romanian-born American artist, video game and pinball machine designer (Joust, Taxi, PIN•BOT), cancer.
- Gil Askey, 89, American-born Australian musician and composer (Lady Sings the Blues), lymphoma.
- Chris Banks, 41, American football player (Denver Broncos, Atlanta Falcons).
- Jacob Birnbaum, 87, German-born American Jewish activist, founder of the Student Struggle for Soviet Jewry.
- Peter Michael Blayney, 93, Australian artist.
- Jos Chabert, 81, Belgian politician, Minister of State (2009).
- Joan Crespo Hita, 87, Spanish road bicycle racer.
- Rory Ellinger, 72, American politician, member of the Missouri House of Representatives (since 2010), liver cancer.
- Norman Girvan, 72, Jamaican professor and politician, Secretary General of the Association of Caribbean States (2000–2004), fall.
- Robin Holliday, 81, British molecular biologist.
- Sir James Holt, 91, British medieval historian.
- Daniel S. Koltun, 80, American theoretical physicist.
- Boniface Lele, 66, Kenyan Roman Catholic prelate, Archbishop of Mombasa (2005–2013), Bishop of Kitui (1995–2005), cardiac arrest.
- René Mertens, 92, Belgian cyclist.
- Eddie Miller, 82, American basketball player.
- Ale Narendra, 67, Indian politician, MP for Nizamabad (1999–2004) and Medak (2004–2008), Andhra Pradesh MLA for Himayatnagar (1983–1999).
- Val Ogden, 90, American politician, member of the Washington House of Representatives (1991–2003), cancer.
- Ib Planck, 84, Danish Olympic long-distance runner.
- A. N. R. Robinson, 87, Trinbagonian politician, President (1997–2003), Prime Minister (1986–1991), recognized for role in establishing the International Criminal Court.
- Ferdinando Terruzzi, 90, Italian Olympic champion cyclist (1948).
- Svetlana Velmar-Janković, 80, Serbian writer.

=== 10 ===
- Dominique Baudis, 66, French journalist, writer and politician, Mayor of Toulouse (1983–2001), cancer.
- Justin Marie Bomboko, 86, Congolese politician, Head of Government (1960–1961), Foreign Minister (1960–1963, 1965–1969, 1981).
- George Bornemissza, 90, Australian entomologist and ecologist.
- Ray Colledge, 91, British climber and mountaineer.
- Commendable, 16, American Thoroughbred racehorse, won the 2000 Belmont Stakes.
- Joe Dini, 85, American politician, member of the Nevada House of Representatives (1967–2002).
- Bill Doolittle, 90, American football player and coach (Western Michigan Broncos).
- László Felkai, 73, Hungarian Olympic champion and dual bronze medallist water polo player (1960, 1964, 1968).
- Jim Flaherty, 64, Canadian politician, Minister of Finance (2006–2014), MP for Whitby—Oshawa (since 2006), MPP for Whitby—Ajax (1995–2005), heart attack.
- Phyllis Frelich, 70, American actress (Children of a Lesser God, Santa Barbara, Children on Their Birthdays), Tony winner (1980), progressive supranuclear palsy.
- Ken Greengrass, 87, American television producer.
- Carol Grimaldi, 75, American restaurateur, co-founder of Grimaldi's Pizzeria, cancer.
- James Hilleary, 90, American architect and painter.
- Ján Hirka, 90, Slovak Catholic hierarch, Bishop of Prešov (1990–2002).
- Richard Hoggart, 95, British academic and author (The Uses of Literacy), dementia.
- Thomas M. Jacobs, 87, American Olympic skier (1952).
- M. Daniel Lane, 83, American biochemist, myeloma.
- Doris Pilkington Garimara, 76, Australian author (Follow the Rabbit-Proof Fence), ovarian cancer.
- Gregory White Smith, 62, American biographer (Jackson Pollock: An American Saga), Pulitzer Prize winner (1991), brain tumor.
- Anatoly Sukhorukov, 78, Russian physicist.
- Eddy Thomas, 82, Jamaican dancer, choreographer and teacher, co-founder of National Dance Theatre Company.
- Sue Townsend, 68, British novelist and playwright (Adrian Mole series), stroke.
- Sidney Weintraub, 91, American economist.
- Kenji Yamada, 90, American-Japanese judoka.

=== 11 ===
- Alfredo Alcón, 84, Argentine actor (The Innocents, El Santo de la Espada, Sugar Harvest), respiratory disease.
- Antonio Aldonza, 88, Spanish footballer.
- Eppie Archuleta, 92, American weaving artist, recipient of the National Heritage Fellowship (1985).
- Nandu Bhende, 58, Indian musician and actor, heart attack.
- Rolf Brem, 88, Swiss graphic artist, sculptor and illustrator.
- Hal Cooper, 91, American television director and producer (I Dream of Jeannie, Maude, Gimme a Break!), heart failure.
- Edna Doré, 92, British actress (EastEnders, Les Misérables, Another Year), emphysema.
- Dunstan Endawie Enchana, 78, Malaysian politician, Sarawak MLA for Krian, Deputy Chief Minister (1977–1979), High Commissioner to Australia and New Zealand.
- Cele Hahn, 72, American politician and media owner (WNNZ (AM), WNNZ-FM), member of the Massachusetts House of Representatives (1995–2003).
- Nevyl Hand, 90, Australian rugby league player.
- Bill Henry, 86, American baseball player (Boston Red Sox, Cincinnati Reds), heart attack.
- Zander Hollander, 91, American sportswriter, journalist, editor and archivist.
- Lou Hudson, 69, American basketball player (St. Louis Hawks, Los Angeles Lakers), complications from a stroke.
- Myer S. Kripke, 100, American rabbi and philanthropist.
- Bernard J. Lechner, 82, American electronics engineer (RCA).
- Leonard Levy, 74, Jamaican cricketer.
- William J. Lyons Jr., 92, American politician, member of the Connecticut House of Representatives and Senate.
- Eugene McGehee, 85, American lawyer, jurist and politician, member of the Louisiana House of Representatives (1960–1972).
- Helga Mees, 76, German Olympic silver- and bronze-medalist fencer (1964).
- Sergey Nepobedimy, 92, Soviet rocket designer (3M6 Shmel, Arena, OTR-23 Oka, OTR-21 Tochka, 9K11 Malyutka).
- Ron Pundak, 58, Israeli diplomat, involved in Oslo I Accord, cancer.
- Don Robertson, 83, American baseball player (Chicago Cubs).
- Sanggeun, 9, South Korean dog actor, complications from cancer.
- Minoru Sano, 63, Japanese chef, multiple organ failure.
- Patrick Seale, 83, Northern Irish journalist, foreign correspondent and historian (The Observer), brain cancer.
- Rolando Ugolini, 89, Italian-born British footballer (Middlesbrough).
- Jesse Winchester, 69, American musician and songwriter, bladder cancer.
- Carl Zimmermann, 96, American news anchor (WITI) and World War II war correspondent.
- Darrell Zwerling, 85, American actor (Chinatown, Grease, Starsky and Hutch).

=== 12 ===
- Pierre Autin-Grenier, 67, French author.
- Robin Capell, 79, South African cricketer.
- Jerry Carle, 90, American football, basketball, and baseball player and coach.
- James M. Coleman, 90, American politician, member of the New Jersey General Assembly (1966–1972).
- Eduard Gaugler, 85, German economist.
- Beverly Hanson, 89, American golfer, U.S. Amateur Champion (1950), LPGA Championship (1955), Western Open (1956), Titleholders Championship (1958), complications of Alzheimer's and COPD.
- Robert Harder, 84, American politician, member of the Kansas House of Representatives (1961–1967), brain tumor.
- Fred Ho, 56, American saxophonist, composer and social activist, complications from colorectal cancer.
- Brita Koivunen, 82, Finnish schlager singer.
- Pierre-Henri Menthéour, 53, French racing cyclist, cancer.
- My Flag, 21, American Thoroughbred racehorse, euthanized.
- Øystein Øystå, 79, Norwegian writer.
- Maurício Alves Peruchi, 24, Brazilian footballer, traffic collision.
- Robert Potter, 64, British geographer.
- Hal R. Smith, 82, American baseball player (St. Louis Cardinals).
- Billy Standridge, 60, American race car driver and team owner (NASCAR, Nationwide Series), cancer.
- Hamish Watt, 88, Scottish politician, MP for Banffshire (1974–1979).

=== 13 ===
- Michael Boddy, 80, English-Australian actor and writer.
- Howard Brandt, 75, American physicist.
- John Brunsdon, 80, British artist.
- Emma Castelnuovo, 100, Italian mathematician.
- Mahay Choramo, Ethiopian evangelist.
- Peter Clarke, 84, South African artist.
- Peter Drummond-Murray of Mastrick, 84, Scottish herald and banker.
- Fred Enke, 89, American football player (Detroit Lions, Philadelphia Eagles), dementia.
- Pat Gish, 87, American journalist (The Mountain Eagle), complications from kidney failure.
- Sally Haydon, 55, American equestrian and academic.
- Edward Kamuda, 74, American historian, co-founder of the Titanic Historical Society, consultant on Titanic.
- Ernesto Laclau, 78, Argentine post-Marxist political theorist, heart attack.
- Otto Petersen, 53, American ventriloquist and comedian (Otto & George).
- Michael Ruppert, 63, American author, journalist, radio show host and conspiracy hawk, suicide by gunshot.
- Theoklitos Setakis, 83, Greek Orthodox hierarch, Metropolitan Bishop of Ioannina (since 1975).
- Irene Shepard, 91, American politician, member of the New Hampshire House of Representatives.
- Rafał Sznajder, 41, Polish Olympic fencer (1996, 2000, 2004), heart attack.

=== 14 ===
- Kshetra Pratap Adhikary, 70–71, Nepali poet and writer, heart attack.
- Roland Issifu Alhassan, 81, Ghanaian diplomat and politician, Ambassador to Germany (2001–2006), MP for Tolon-Kumbungu (1969–1971, 1979–1981), co-founder of the New Patriotic Party.
- Ian Askew, 92, British officer.
- Howard Behrens, 80, American artist.
- Reid Buckley, 83, American novelist, public speaker and columnist, cancer.
- Nina Cassian, 89, Romanian poet, heart attack.
- Joe Curl, 59, American basketball coach (University of Houston), heart failure.
- Phillip Hayes Dean, 83, American stage actor, director and playwright, aortic aneurysm.
- Reg Egan, 86, Australian footballer.
- Peter Ellson, 88, English footballer (Crewe Alexandra).
- Brian Harradine, 79, Australian politician, Senator for Tasmania (1975–2005), longest-serving independent parliamentarian, stroke.
- Thorleif Holth, 83, Norwegian politician.
- Ollie Hopkins, 78, English footballer (Barnsley, Peterborough United, Brentwood Town).
- Norman Kelvin, 89, American scholar.
- Crad Kilodney, 66, Canadian writer, cancer.
- Ingeborg von Kusserow, 95, German actress.
- Albert Manent, 83, Spanish writer and activist.
- Rudolf Matutinović, 87, Croatian sculptor.
- Shijuro Ogata, 86, Japanese banker.
- Wally Olins, 83, British business consultancy and public relations executive, Chairman of Saffron Brand Consultants.
- Manuel Ortega, 92, Spanish painter.
- Armando Peraza, 89, Cuban-born American Latin jazz percussionist (Santana, George Shearing, Dave Brubeck), pneumonia.
- Paul Sadala, Congolese militant, shot.
- Davorin Savnik, 85, Slovene industrial designer and architect.
- Raymond K. Shepardson, 70, American preservationist and theatre restoration specialist.
- Bill Sinegal, 85, American rhythm and blues musician.
- Mick Staton, 74, American politician, member of the U.S. House of Representatives for West Virginia's 3rd district (1981–1983).
- Pierre Thiolon, 87, French basketball player, Olympic silver medallist (1948).

=== 15 ===
- Kirsten Bishopric, 50, Canadian voice actress (Sailor Moon, Jacob Two-Two Meets the Hooded Fang, Frequency), lung cancer.
- Little Joe Cook, 91, American doo-wop singer and songwriter.
- Robert-Casimir Dosseh-Anyron, 88, Togolese Roman Catholic prelate, Archbishop of Lomé (1962–1992).
- John L. Ducker, 91, American politician, member of the Florida House of Representatives (1960–1968).
- Shane Gibson, 35, American guitarist (Korn, stOrk), complications from a blood clotting disorder.
- Lowell P. Hager, 87, American enzymologist and protein chemist.
- Robert Heard, 84, American journalist (Associated Press), complications from hip surgery.
- William Hird, 92, Australian cricketer.
- John Houbolt, 95, American aerospace engineer, complications from Parkinson's disease.
- Júnior, 70, Spanish singer and actor.
- Don King, 85, American football player (Cleveland Browns, Denver Broncos, Green Bay Packers).
- Luo Qingchang, 96, Chinese politician, member of the Central Committee (1973–1987) and Standing Committee (1978–1983).
- Thomas C. Salamone, 87, American politician, member of the Connecticut House of Representatives (1963–1971).
- Ratchanee Sripraiwan, 82, Thai language scholar, author and academic.
- Claudio Tello, 50, Chilean footballer (Cobreloa), cancer.
- Rosemary Tonks, 85, British poet.
- Eliseo Verón, 78, Argentine sociologist, anthropologist and semiotician, cancer.
- Hugo Villar, 88, Uruguayan physician and politician.
- Sir Owen Woodhouse, 97, New Zealand judge, member of the Supreme Court, President of the Court of Appeal (1981–1986).
- Anselmo Zarza Bernal, 97, Mexican Roman Catholic prelate, Bishop of Linares (1962–1966) and León (1966–1992).

=== 16 ===
- Joan Blanch, 77, Spanish lawyer and politician, Mayor of Badalona (1983–1999), cancer.
- Raymond S. Brandes, 90, American archaeologist and historian.
- Anne Briscoe, 96, American biochemist.
- Brock Brower, 82, American writer.
- Gyude Bryant, 65, Liberian politician, Chairman of the Transitional Government (2003–2006).
- Douglas L. Coleman, 82, Canadian scientist and philanthropist, recipient of the Shaw Prize (2009) and the Albert Lasker Award (2010).
- Jim Cotter, 71, English priest.
- Richard Greenfield, 71, American newspaper publisher (Jewish Ledger).
- Khosrow Jahanbani, 72, Iranian royal (Qajar dynasty).
- Stan Kelly-Bootle, 84, British songwriter, author and computer engineer.
- Frank Kopel, 65, Scottish footballer (Dundee United), complications from dementia.
- Alec Moores, 94, Canadian politician.
- Jiří Načeradský, 74, Czech artist.
- Basil A. Paterson, 87, American politician and labor lawyer, New York Secretary of State (1979–1983), member of the New York Senate (1965–1970).
- Leonard Rosen, 83, American bankruptcy lawyer, co-founder of Wachtell, Lipton, Rosen & Katz.
- Aulis Rytkönen, 85, Finnish football player and manager.
- Jacques Servier, 92, French physician and pharmaceutical executive, founder of Servier Laboratories.
- Ernst Florian Winter, 90, Austrian-American historian and political scientist.

=== 17 ===
- Ashwath Aiyappa, 30, Indian cricketer, drowned.
- Mayra Alejandra, 58, Venezuelan actress, cancer.
- Nancy Brataas, 86, American politician, member of the Minnesota Senate (1975–1992), emphysema and COPD.
- Steve Cappiello, 89, American politician, Mayor of Hoboken, New Jersey (1981–1984).
- Allison DeLong, 73, Canadian politician.
- Cheo Feliciano, 78, American Puerto Rican salsa and bolero composer and singer, traffic collision.
- Andrés Uriel Gallego, 64, Colombian civil engineer and politician, Minister of Transport (2002–2010), cancer.
- Gabriel García Márquez, 87, Colombian author (One Hundred Years of Solitude, Love in the Time of Cholera), laureate of the Nobel Prize in Literature (1982), pneumonia.
- Jon Imber, 63, American artist, complications from amyotrophic lateral sclerosis.
- Michael C. Janeway, 73, American newspaper editor (Boston Globe), academic and author, cancer.
- Bernat Klein, 91, Yugoslavian-born Scottish fashion designer and spy.
- McDowell Lee, 89, American politician, member of the Alabama House of Representatives (1955–1962), Secretary of the Alabama Senate (1963–2011), cancer.
- Wojciech Leśnikowski, 75, Polish architect and academic, cancer.
- Henry Maksoud, 85, Brazilian businessman, cardiac arrest.
- Anthony Marriott, 83, British actor and playwright.
- Karl Meiler, 64, German tennis player, complications from a fall.
- Raul Bragança Neto, 68, São Toméan politician, Prime Minister (1996–1999).
- L. Jay Oliva, 80, American academic and educator, President of New York University (1991–2002), pancreatic cancer.
- Volodymyr Rybak, 42, Ukrainian politician.
- Karpal Singh, 73, Malaysian lawyer and politician, MP for Jelutong (1978–1999) and Bukit Gelugor (since 2004), Chairman of DAP (2004–2014), traffic collision.
- Lloyd Sommerlad, 95, Australian politician, member of the New South Wales Legislative Council (1955–1967).
- Nikolaos Vorvolakos, 83, Greek Army officer, head of the Cypriot National Guard (1993–1998).

=== 18 ===
- Habib Boularès, 80, Tunisian politician and diplomat, President of the Chamber of Deputies (1991–1997).
- David W. Burke, 78, American television news executive, first chairman of the Broadcasting Board of Governors, President of CBS News (1988–1990).
- Donald Dahl, 69, American politician, member of the Kansas House of Representatives (1996–2008), plane crash.
- Guru Dhanapal, 55, Indian film director (Unna Nenachen Pattu Padichen, Suyamvaram, Periya Manushan).
- Mirko Đorđević, 75, Serbian publicist.
- Sanford Jay Frank, 59, American television writer (Late Night with David Letterman, In Living Color, The Fresh Prince of Bel-Air), brain cancer.
- Robert Keith Gray, 92, American lobbyist and public relations official.
- Johnley Hatimoana, 57, Solomon Islands politician, MP for Ngella (since 2013), pneumonia.
- Deon Jackson, 68, American soul singer and songwriter, brain hemorrhage.
- Lindy Kasperski, 63, Canadian politician.
- Eduard Kosolapov, 38, Russian footballer, suicide by gunshot.
- Trygve Lange-Nielsen, 92, Norwegian barrister and judge.
- Ramon Malla Call, 91, Spanish Roman Catholic prelate, Bishop of Lleida (1968–1999), acting Co-Prince of Andorra (1969–1971).
- David McClarty, 63, Northern Irish politician, MLA for East Londonderry (since 1998), cancer.
- Antonín Molčík, 74, Czech actor.
- Tim Moran, 95, American politician, member of the Utah House of Representatives (1984–1996).
- Brian Priestman, 87, British maestro and conductor (Denver Symphony Orchestra).
- Andrew Sessler, 85, American physicist and academic (University of California, Berkeley), recipient of the Enrico Fermi Award (2013), cancer.
- Zev Sufott, 86, British-born Israeli diplomat, Ambassador to the Netherlands and China.
- Dylan Tombides, 20, Australian footballer (West Ham United), testicular cancer.

=== 19 ===
- Bashir Ahmad, 74, Bangladeshi playback singer.
- Steve Antone, 92, American politician, member of the Idaho House of Representatives (1968–1996).
- Theophil Antonicek, 76, Austrian musicologist.
- Lindy Berry, 86, Canadian CFL football player (Edmonton Eskimos), complications from pneumonia.
- Helena Bliss, 96, American actress and soprano.
- Yuriy Chyrkov, 66, Russian football player and coach.
- Derek Cooper, 88, British broadcaster (The Food Programme) and food journalist, Parkinson's disease.
- Luciano do Valle, 66, Brazilian sports commentator.
- George Downton, 85, English cricketer (Kent).
- Kan Cheong Dunn, 89, Taiwanese ambassador.
- Richard Elrod, 80, American sheriff (Cook County, Illinois) and politician, member of the Illinois House of Representatives (1968–1970), liver cancer and cirrhosis.
- Diomid Gherman, 86, Moldovan academic and politician.
- John R. Gibson, 88, American senior circuit judge.
- Robert Gunnell, 87, British broadcaster.
- Mimi Kok, 80, Dutch actress, pulmonary disease.
- Aaron Landes, 84, American rabbi and U.S. Navy chaplain, leukemia.
- Hamish Maxwell, 87, British-born American businessman.
- Ian McIntyre, 82, Scottish radio broadcaster and executive (BBC Radio 3, BBC Radio 4).
- Mark Prothero, 57, American swimmer (USA Swimming) and defense lawyer (Gary Ridgway), lung cancer.
- Erik Schmidt, 88, Estonian painter and writer.
- Kevin Sharp, 43, American country music singer, complications from a digestive disorder.
- Adhik Shirodkar, Indian lawyer and politician.
- Sonia Silvestre, 61, Dominican singer and announcer, stroke.
- Barry Sterling, 70, American politician, member of the Tennessee House of Representatives.
- John Stopp, 80, Australian politician, member of the Tasmanian Legislative Council (1983–1995).
- Vladimir Struzhanov, 81, Russian Olympic swimmer.
- Frits Thors, 104, Dutch journalist and news anchor.
- Hrant Vardanyan, 65, Armenian businessman, heart disease.
- Arthur Woodhouse, 80, English cricketer.

=== 20 ===
- Joyce Anderson, 90, American furniture designer and woodworker.
- Ruth Baltra Moreno, 75, Chilean actress, playwright, teacher, and theater director.
- Mithat Bayrak, 85, Turkish Olympic champion wrestler (1956, 1960) and trainer.
- Bill Blair, 92, American baseball player (Indianapolis Clowns), journalist and civil rights activist.
- Torrey C. Brown, 77, American politician, member of the Maryland House of Delegates (1970–1994), Secretary for Natural Resources (1983–1994), heart disease.
- Rubin Carter, 76, American middleweight boxer, subject of "Hurricane" and The Hurricane, prostate cancer.
- Beanie Cooper, 86, American football coach.
- Theodore Dollarhide, 65, American composer.
- David Kerr, 86, British nephrologist.
- Robert E. Longacre, 92, American linguist.
- Alistair MacLeod, 77, Canadian author, complications from a stroke.
- George E. McDonald, 90, American labor union leader.
- Benedikt Sarnov, 87, Russian author and literary critic.
- Peter Scoones, 76, British underwater photographer (Life on Earth, Planet Earth, The Blue Planet).
- Yoshio Shinozuka, 90, Japanese Imperial Army soldier (Unit 731).
- Julian Wilson, 73, British horse racing correspondent and broadcaster (BBC), cancer.
- Neville Wran, 87, Australian politician, Premier of New South Wales (1976–1986), dementia.

=== 21 ===
- Edmund Abel, 92, American inventor, patented design for Mr. Coffee machine.
- Donald Bogue, 96, American sociologist.
- Eliza T. Dresang, 72, American academic and author.
- Mundo Earwood, 61, American country music singer-songwriter, pancreatic cancer.
- Herb Gray, 82, Canadian politician, Deputy Prime Minister (1997–2002), MP for Essex West (1962–1968) and Windsor West (1968–2002).
- Tage Grøndahl, 82, Danish Olympic rower.
- Janet Gray Hayes, 87, American politician, Mayor of San Jose (1975–1983), stroke.
- George H. Heilmeier, 77, American inventor and technology executive, championed LCD displays, stroke.
- Lionel Heinrich, 80, Canadian ice hockey player (Boston Bruins).
- Craig Hill, 88, American actor (Whirlybirds, The Black Shield of Falworth, All About Eve).
- Ladislav Hlaváček, 88, Czechoslovak football player (Dukla Prague).
- Weldon Kern, 90, American basketball player (Oklahoma A&M Aggies).
- John Kompara, 78, American football player (Los Angeles Chargers).
- Harry Koundakjian, 83, American news photographer and editor (Associated Press), complications from open heart surgery.
- Alexander Lenkov, 70, Russian actor, People's Artist (1997).
- Roy Matsumoto, 100, American World War II veteran, recipient of the Congressional Gold Medal (2011).
- Arlene McQuade, 77, American actress (The Goldbergs, The Milton Berle Show), Parkinson's disease.
- Albert Onyeawuna, 78, Nigerian footballer (national team).
- Ronald D. Palmer, 81, American diplomat.
- Ramón Pons, 73, Spanish actor (Murder in a Blue World), anemia.
- Gene Timms, 81, American politician, member of the Oregon Senate (1982–2000).
- Francisco Ovidio Vera Intriago, 71, Ecuadorian Roman Catholic prelate, Auxiliary Bishop of Portoviejo (since 1992), kidney disease.
- Win Tin, 85, Burmese journalist and political prisoner, recipient of the UNESCO/Guillermo Cano World Press Freedom Prize (2001), renal failure.

=== 22 ===
- Harry Bell, 89, English footballer (Middlesbrough).
- Abdul Qadir, 70, Afghan politician, Minister of Defense (1978, 1982–1986).
- Neil Chanmugam, 73, Sri Lankan cricketer.
- Mária Gál, 68, Hungarian Olympic volleyball player.
- Fiona Hale, 88, American actress (The Curious Case of Benjamin Button, Minority Report, Seven Pounds).
- John Hannigan, 75, Irish Gaelic footballer (Donegal).
- Allen Jacobs, 72, American football player (Green Bay Packers, New York Giants), heart attack.
- Bill Klucas, 72, American basketball coach, journalist and political consultant, liver cancer.
- Erzsébet Komlóssy, 80, Hungarian mezzo-soprano.
- Jovan Krkobabić, 84, Serbian politician, Deputy Prime Minister (since 2008), Minister of Labour, Employment and Social Policy (since 2012).
- Dennis Liwewe, 77, Zambian football player and commentator, liver failure.
- Alfonso Márquez de la Plata, 80, Chilean politician, Minister of Agriculture (1977–1980), General Secretary of Government (1984) and Labour (1984–1988), pneumonia.
- Ricardo Mórtola, 63, Ecuadorian architect.
- Mohammad Naseem, 90, British Islamic leader and political activist, chairman of Birmingham Central Mosque.
- Chris Nkulor, Nigerian actor, kidney ailment.
- Bob Orders, 82, American football player (Army Black Knights, West Virginia Mountaineers).
- Werner Potzernheim, 87, German Olympic bronze-medalist cyclist (1952).
- Safely Kept, 28, American Thoroughbred racehorse, euthanized.
- Peppi Schwaiger, 83, German Olympic alpine skier.
- Gordon Smith, 93, British army officer.
- Oswaldo Vigas, 90, Venezuelan painter.
- Val Werier, 96, Canadian journalist (Winnipeg Free Press).
- Martynas Yčas, 96, Russian-born American microbiologist.

=== 23 ===
- Yozo Aoki, 85, Japanese footballer (national team).
- Benjamín Brea, 67, Spanish-born Venezuelan musician, stomach cancer.
- Monte Geralds, 79, American politician, member of the Michigan House of Representatives.
- Michael Glawogger, 54, Austrian film director (Workingman's Death, Whores' Glory, Slumming), malaria.
- Władyslawa Górska, 94, Polish chess player.
- Jaap Havekotte, 102, Dutch skater, skate inventor and centenarian.
- Kenneth A. R. Kennedy, 83, American archaeologist and paleontologist.
- Federico Ling Altamirano, 75, Mexican diplomat and politician, Ambassador to the Vatican, Senator for Mexico City (2000–2006).
- Connie Marrero, 102, Cuban baseball player (Washington Senators), oldest former Major League Baseball player.
- Leonhard Pohl, 84, German Olympic runner (1956).
- Lorenzo Relova, 98, Filipino judge, Associate Justice of the Supreme Court (1982–1986).
- F. Michael Rogers, 92, American Air Force general, complications from Parkinson's disease.
- Roby Schaeffer, 83, Luxembourgish Olympic sprinter.
- Mark Shand, 62, British travel writer and conservationist, injuries sustained from a fall.
- Patric Standford, 75, English composer.
- Dixie Tan, 78, Singaporean cardiologist and politician, MP for Ulu Pandan (1984–1991), brain cancer.
- Zhu Qizhen, 86, Chinese diplomat and politician, Vice Minister of Foreign Affairs (1984–1989), Ambassador to the United States (1989–1993).

=== 24 ===
- Angeles Arrien, 73–74, Basque-American cultural anthropologist, educator, author, lecturer and consultant, pneumonia.
- Ricardo Bauleo, 73, Argentine actor, heart failure.
- Bogdan Borčić, 87, Slovene painter, printmaker, and educator.
- Louis Gage, 85, American Olympic boxer.
- Hans Hollein, 80, Austrian architect (Museum für Moderne Kunst, Haas House), laureate of the Pritzker Architecture Prize (1985), pneumonia.
- Sandy Jardine, 65, Scottish footballer (Rangers, Hearts, national team), liver cancer.
- Ken Kagaya, 70, Japanese politician.
- Janet Kalven, 100, American Catholic educator and writer.
- James H. Kasler, 87, American Air Force officer, three-time recipient of the Air Force Cross.
- Michel Lang, 74, French film and television director, Alzheimer's disease.
- Rolf Johan Lenschow, 85, Norwegian civil engineer.
- Eugène Letendre, 82, French cyclist.
- Moslem Malakouti, 89, Iranian Shiite cleric.
- Ray Musto, 85, American politician, member of the U.S. House for Pennsylvania's 11th district (1980–1981), Pennsylvania House (1971–1980) and Senate (1983–2010), cancer.
- Barry O'Keefe, 80, Australian judge, member of the NSW Supreme Court (1993–2004), Commissioner of the Independent Commission Against Corruption (1994–1999).
- Konstantin Orbelyan, 85, Armenian composer and conductor.
- Sister Ping, 65, Chinese convicted people smuggler, cancer.
- Bogdan Poniatowski, 82, Polish Olympic rower (1960) and coach.
- Shobha Nagi Reddy, 45, Indian politician, Andhra Pradesh MLA for Allagadda (since 1996), traffic collision.
- Tadeusz Różewicz, 92, Polish poet and playwright, recipient of the Austrian State Prize for European Literature (1982).
- Eddie Rubin, 79, American rock and jazz drummer and composer, cardiac failure.
- Vishweshwar Thool, 67, Indian cricketer.
- Frederick C. Turner, 90, American Navy officer, vice admiral.
- Jerzy Wieteski, 79, Polish footballer.

=== 25 ===
- Florentino Bautista, 83, Filipino Olympic basketball player.
- Flor Coffey, 93, Irish hurler.
- Boniface Nyema Dalieh, 80, Liberian Roman Catholic prelate, Bishop of Cape Palmas (1973–2008).
- Dandeniya Hemachandra de Silva, 81, Sri Lankan cricketer.
- Dan Heap, 88, Canadian politician, MP for Spadina (1981–1988) and Trinity—Spadina (1988–1993), Alzheimer's disease.
- James Higginbotham, 72, American philosopher of language.
- William Judson Holloway Jr., 90, American judge, member of the US 10th Circuit Court of Appeals (since 1968), respiratory illness.
- Stanko Lorger, 83, Slovene Yugoslav Olympic hurdler (1952, 1956, 1960).
- Paulo Malhães, 76, Brazilian soldier, heart attack.
- Ernest G. McClain, 95, American professor emeritus of music, natural causes.
- Connor Michalek, 8, American professional wrestling fan, medulloblastoma.
- Earl Morrall, 79, American football player (Baltimore Colts, Detroit Lions, Miami Dolphins), complications from Parkinson's disease.
- Mukund Varadarajan, 32, Indian army officer, awarded Ashok Chakra, shot.
- Tito Vilanova, 45, Spanish football player and coach (Barcelona), throat cancer.
- Stefanie Zweig, 81, German writer (Nowhere in Africa).

=== 26 ===
- Georgy Adelson-Velsky, 92, Russian mathematician and computer scientist.
- Bill Ash, 96, American-born British Marxist writer, Royal Canadian Air Force pilot during World War II.
- José Moreira Bastos Neto, 61, Brazilian Roman Catholic prelate, Bishop of Três Lagoas (since 2009), heart attack.
- David Brokenshire, 89, New Zealand potter and architect.
- Joan Bruce, 86, British-born Australian actress (Dot and the Kangaroo).
- Paul Copenhaver, 72, American politician.
- Werner J. Dannhauser, 84, German-born American political philosopher.
- Tony DiMidio, 71, American football player (Kansas City Chiefs).
- Ole Enger, 65, Norwegian actor, cancer.
- Jacqueline Ferrand, 96, French mathematician.
- Manfred Fuchs, 75, German aerospace engineer, founded OHB System.
- Protacio Gungon, 88, Filipino Roman Catholic prelate, Bishop of Antipolo (1983–2001).
- Gerald Guralnik, 77, American physicist, co-original Higgs mechanism and Higgs boson theorist, recipient of the Sakurai Prize (2010).
- Patrick Hanan, 87, New Zealand sinologist and author.
- Adrian Haynes, 88, American Wampanoag chief.
- Michael Heisley, 77, American billionaire aerospace defense executive (HEICO) and basketball franchise owner (Memphis Grizzlies), complications from a stroke.
- Tim Hunt, 39, American professional baseball player and USA national softball team member, ATV accident.
- David Langner, 62, American football player (Auburn Tigers), key player in "Punt Bama Punt" (1972 Iron Bowl), cancer.
- Sandro Lopopolo, 74, Italian Olympic silver-medalist lightweight boxer (1960), WBC champion light welterweight (1966–1967), respiratory infection.
- Lee Marshall, 64, American radio personality, professional wrestling announcer and voice actor (Tony The Tiger), esophageal cancer.
- Yiya Murano, 83, Argentine serial killer.
- Tony Ninos, 94, American politician and hotelier, Mayor of Cocoa, Florida (1959–1963), member of the Florida House of Representatives (1966–1967).
- Aloísio Roque Oppermann, 77, Brazilian Roman Catholic prelate, Archbishop of Uberaba (1996–2012). (body discovered on this date)
- Antonio Pica, 83, Spanish actor.
- Judith Pinsker, 74, American television writer (Ryan's Hope, General Hospital).
- Bob Powell, 80, American baseball player (Chicago White Sox).
- DJ Rashad, 34, American footwork disc jockey, blood clot in leg.
- Seth Roberts, 61, American psychologist and self-help author.
- Paul Robeson Jr., 86, American archivist and author, lymphoma.
- Adolf Seilacher, 89, German palaeontologist.
- Pete Snelson, 91, American politician.
- Glen Stassen, 78, American Baptist ethicist and theologian, cancer.
- Philip Sugden, 67, English historian and true crime writer (Jack the Ripper), cerebral haemorrhage. (body discovered on this date)
- Stan Turley, 93, American politician, member of the Arizona Senate (1973–1985) and House of Representatives (1965–1973), Speaker (1967–1968), natural causes.
- Richard Zirk, 77, American weightlifter.

=== 27 ===
- Yigal Arnon, 84, Israeli lawyer.
- Vujadin Boškov, 82, Yugoslav Olympic silver-medalist football player (1956) and coach (national team, Real Madrid).
- Al Clayton, 79, American photographer.
- Dan Colchico, 76, American football player (San Francisco 49ers), complications from heart surgery.
- Theo Constanté, 80, Ecuadorian artist.
- Micheline Dax, 90, French comedian and actress.
- Rakesh Deewana, 44–45, Indian actor, complications from bariatric surgery.
- DJ E-Z Rock, 46, American hip-hop musician (Rob Base and DJ E-Z Rock), complications from diabetes.
- T. Scarlett Epstein, 91, British-Austrian social anthropologist and economist.
- Harry Firth, 96, Australian racing driver and team manager.
- Peter Hallock, 89, American organist and choirmaster (Compline Choir).
- Vasco Graça Moura, 72, Portuguese lawyer, writer, translator and politician, cancer.
- Ilija Ničić, 91, Serbian Olympic sport shooter (1960).
- Andréa Parisy, 78, French actress (The Little Bather, Babes a GoGo).
- Marlbert Pradd, 69, American basketball player (New Orleans Buccaneers).
- Turhan Tezol, 81, Turkish Olympic basketball player (1952).
- Marsden Wagner, 84, American obstetrician.
- Fred Zebouni, 100, Lebanese Olympic sailor.

=== 28 ===
- Toimi Alatalo, 85, Finnish cross-country skier, Olympic champion (1960).
- Gerard Benson, 83, British poet, cancer.
- Pedro Cunha, 33, Portuguese actor, suicide by asphyxiation.
- Barbara Fiske Calhoun, 94, American cartoonist.
- Garnet de la Hunt, 80, South African scout, Chairman of the World Scout Committee (1999–2002), cancer.
- Damião António Franklin, 63, Angolan Roman Catholic prelate, Archbishop of Luanda (since 2001).
- Valeri Goryushev, 40, Russian Olympic silver medallist volleyball player (1996, 2000).
- William Honan, 83, American journalist and author, cardiac arrest.
- Amaka Igwe, 51, Nigerian film director and producer, asthma attack.
- Dennis Kamakahi, 61, American Grammy Award-winning musician, lung cancer.
- Richard Kershaw, 80, British broadcaster and journalist.
- Ismail Sulemanji Khatri, 76, Indian craftsman.
- Derek King, 65, Australian VFL footballer (St Kilda).
- Edgar Laprade, 94, Canadian Hall of Fame ice hockey player (New York Rangers).
- Walt Matthews, 79, American baseball figure (Houston Astros ).
- Kamaruzaman Mohamad, 53, Malaysian journalist and editor (Utusan Malaysia), kidney ailment.
- Dennit Morris, 78, American football player (Houston Oilers, San Francisco 49ers).
- Madan Pande, 70, Indian cricketer.
- J. Dwight Pentecost, 99, American Christian theologian.
- Sidney Postol, 96, American politician, member of the Connecticut House of Representatives.
- Jack Ramsay, 89, American Hall of Fame basketball coach (Portland Trail Blazers), cancer.
- Djahanguir Riahi, 99, French antique collector.
- Idris Sardi, 75, Indonesian violinist and composer.
- Frederic Schwartz, 63, American architect, prostate cancer.
- Ryan Tandy, 32, Australian rugby league player involved in match-fixing scandal, drug overdose.
- Mitraniketan Viswanathan, 86, Indian social reformer and environmentalist, founder of Mitraniketan.
- Bruce Woodgate, 74, British-born American aerospace engineer (NASA), designer and principal investigator for STIS on the Hubble Space Telescope, complications from strokes.

=== 29 ===
- Ali Gul Sangi, 61, Pakistani poet.
- Beverly Baker Fleitz, 84, American tennis player.
- Iveta Bartošová, 48, Czech singer, three-time winner of Zlatý slavík (1986, 1990, 1991), suicide by train.
- Graham Bizzell, 72, Australian cricketer.
- Frank Budd, 74, American Olympic sprinter (1960) and football player (Philadelphia Eagles, Washington Redskins).
- Tahar Chaïbi, 68, Tunisian footballer (Club Africain), complications from a stroke.
- M. V. Devan, 86, Indian artist and academic.
- Don Earl, 81, Australian footballer.
- Russell Edson, 85, American poet.
- Al Feldstein, 88, American writer and editor (Mad, Tales from the Crypt).
- Reuven Feuerstein, 92, Romanian-born Israeli psychologist.
- Paul Goddard, 68, American bass guitarist (Atlanta Rhythm Section), cancer.
- Bob Hoskins, 71, English actor (Who Framed Roger Rabbit, Mona Lisa, The Long Good Friday), BAFTA winner (1987), pneumonia.
- Michael Kadosh, 74, Israeli football player and manager, cancer.
- Glenn Osser, 99, American musician, musical arranger, orchestra leader, and songwriter.
- Barry Ough, 56, Australian footballer (Melbourne).
- Daphne Pochin Mould, 93, British author and photographer.
- Norma Pons, 71, Argentine actress and showgirl, natural causes.
- Ramil Rodriguez, 72, Filipino actor, lung cancer.
- Bassem Sabry, 31, Egyptian journalist, fall.
- Gailene Stock, 68, Australian ballet dancer and executive, Director of the Royal Ballet School (since 1999), cancer.
- Karen Strom, 72, American astronomer.
- Edgars Vinters, 94, Latvian painter.
- Walter Walsh, 106, American FBI agent and Olympic shooter (1948), longest-living Olympic competitor.

=== 30 ===
- Michael Brock, 94, British historian.
- Khaled Choudhury, 94, Indian theatre personality and artist.
- Kartina Dahari, 73, Malaysian singer, ovarian cancer.
- Chris Harris, 71, British actor, cancer.
- Reg Kermode, 87, Australian businessman.
- Leo Kraft, 91, American composer.
- Volodymyr Kudryavtsev, 79, Ukrainian lyricist.
- Julian Lewis, 67, British developmental biologist, cancer.
- Marsha Mehran, 36, Iranian-born American author. (body discovered on this date)
- Judi Meredith, 77, American actress (Ben Casey, The George Burns and Gracie Allen Show, Hotel de Paree).
- Carl E. Moses, 84, American politician, member of the Alaska House of Representatives (1965–1973, 1993–2007).
- Ralph Nattrass, 88, Canadian ice hockey player (Chicago Black Hawks).
- Larry Ramos, 72, American guitarist, banjo player, and vocalist (The Association), metastatic melanoma.
- Deborah Rogers, 76, British literary agent.
- Ian Ross, 73, Australian television news presenter (Nine Network, Seven Network), pancreatic cancer.
- Yukio Takefuta, 78, Japanese English education scholar.
- Sarmad Tariq, 38, Pakistani motivational speaker and paralysis activist, cardiac arrest.
- Junichi Watanabe, 80, Japanese writer (A Lost Paradise), prostate cancer.
- Mieczysław Wilczek, 82, Polish politician, Minister of Industry (1988–1989).
