= James Woodhouse =

James Woodhouse may refer to:

- James Woodhouse (chemist), American surgeon and chemist
- James Woodhouse (poet), English writer
- James Woodhouse, 1st Baron Terrington
- David Woodhouse, 4th Baron Terrington (James Allen David Woodhouse)
- Jim Woodhouse, cricketer
