= Robert Potter =

Robert Potter may refer to:

- Robert Potter (translator) (1721–1804), English translator, poet and cleric
- Robert Potter (Irish politician) (died 1854), Member of the UK Parliament for Limerick City
- Robert Potter (rugby union), rugby union player who represented Australia
- Robert Potter (politician, born 1800) (c. 1800–1842), Congressional Representative from North Carolina, and later Texas Secretary of the Navy
- Robert Brown Potter (1829–1887), American lawyer and soldier
- Robert Potter (architect) (1909–2010), English architect
- Robert Daniel Potter (1923–2009), U.S. federal judge
- Robert L. D. Potter (1833–1893), Wisconsin lawyer and politician
- Robert Potter (geographer) (1950–2014), academic
- Robert Potter (author) (1831-1908)
