= Minoru Sano =

Minoru Sano may refer to:

- Minoru Sano (figure skater)
- Minoru Sano (chef)
