= Theoklitos (given name) =

Theoklitos is a Greek masculine given name. Notable people with the name include:

- Theoklitos Farmakidis (Theoharis Farmakidis; 1784–1860), Greek scholar and journalist
- Theoklitos Karipidis (born 1980), Greek volleyball player
- Theoklitos Polyeidis (1698–1750), Greek scholar, teacher, translator, priest and monk
- Theoklitos Setakis (1930–2014), Greek Orthodox bishop

== See also ==
- Michael Theo (also called Theoklitos)
