= John Wesley Hardin in popular culture =

Pop-culture article

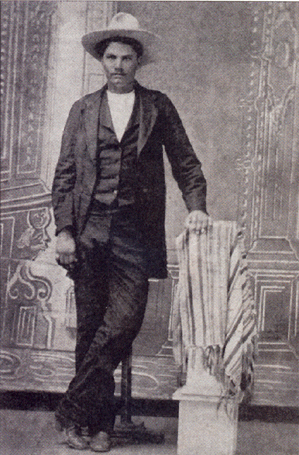
John Wesley Hardin

John Wesley Hardin's legacy as an outlaw has made him a colorful character and the subject of various media works from his own time up to the present day. Many people came to know of Hardin through the TV ad for Time-Life Books "Old West" series. During the description of one book in the series The Gunfighters, the well-known claim is made: "John Wesley Hardin, so mean, he once shot a man just for snoring too loud"

== Depictions ==
John Wesley Hardin is a favorite theme in popular culture:

=== In fiction ===
Hardin has also been the subject or supporting character of various works about the Old West, such as:

- Streets of Laredo by Larry McMurtry features Hardin. He is depicted as a cold and brutal killer.
- James Carlos Blake wrote The Pistoleer, a novelized version of Hardin published in 1995.
- L. B. McGinnis wrote Reflections in Dark Glass, a novel that was published in 1996.
- Four Sixes To Beat: The Tale of a Killer by Bruce N. Croft is a novel published in 2004.

=== In film ===
Hardin has been portrayed on film by:

- John Dehner in the 1951 film The Texas Rangers
- Rock Hudson in the 1953 film The Lawless Breed
- Jack Elam in the 1970 film Dirty Dingus Magee
- Max Perlich in the 1994 film Maverick
- John Wayne's character in The Shootist is loosely based on Hardin.

=== In television ===
- Actor Richard Webb played Hardin in a 1954 episode of Jim Davis' television series Stories of the Century. The segment shows Hardin shooting two Indians in the back; gunning down a sheriff in a saloon in Abilene, Kansas; and finally being outgunned himself by an El Paso officer attempting to arrest him.
- Actor James Griffith played Hardin in the television series Maverick (TV series) episode ("Duel at Sundown") (Feb 1, 1959) . The segment shows Hardin riding up to the Maverick brothers Bart and Bret and asking them if that is the town where John Wesley Hardin was shot?
- Actor Randy Quaid played Hardin in the 1995 miniseries adaptation of Larry McMurtry's Streets of Laredo.
- In a 1998 episode of Antiques Roadshow, a previously unknown and rare photograph of John Wesley Hardin was appraised at a value from $30,000 to $50,000.

=== In music ===
Country music singer Johnny Cash wrote and recorded a song about Hardin titled "Hardin Wouldn't Run," released on his 1965 album Johnny Cash Sings the Ballads of the True West. He had earlier talked about Hardin on the travelogue album Ride This Train.

Bob Dylan named his 1967 album John Wesley Harding after the outlaw, but the name was spelled differently. The title track depicts Hardin as "a friend to the poor" who "was never known to hurt an honest man."

Singer-songwriter Wesley Stace uses the stage name John Wesley Harding.

Hardin is among the outlaws mentioned in the song "Rhymes of the Renegades," by western singer-songwriter Michael Martin Murphey.
