= Chris Nkulor =

Nigerian film actor

- Born: Ariam ala ala, ikwuano LGA Abia State, Nigeria
- Died: 22 April 2014; Ile-Ife, Osun State, Nigeria
- Occupation: Actor
- Children: Kelechi, Precious, and Chidera

Chris Nkulor (died 22 April 2014) was a Nigerian film actor. He is survived by a wife, a son (Kelechi), and two daughters (Precious and Chidera). He was known for his roles in the Nollywood films Battle of Indemnity, Hidden Treasure and Hidden Treasure 2.

Nkulor died on 22 April 2014 at the Obafemi Awolowo University hospital from a kidney ailment.
