= Rudolf Matutinović =

Croatian sculptor (1927–2014)

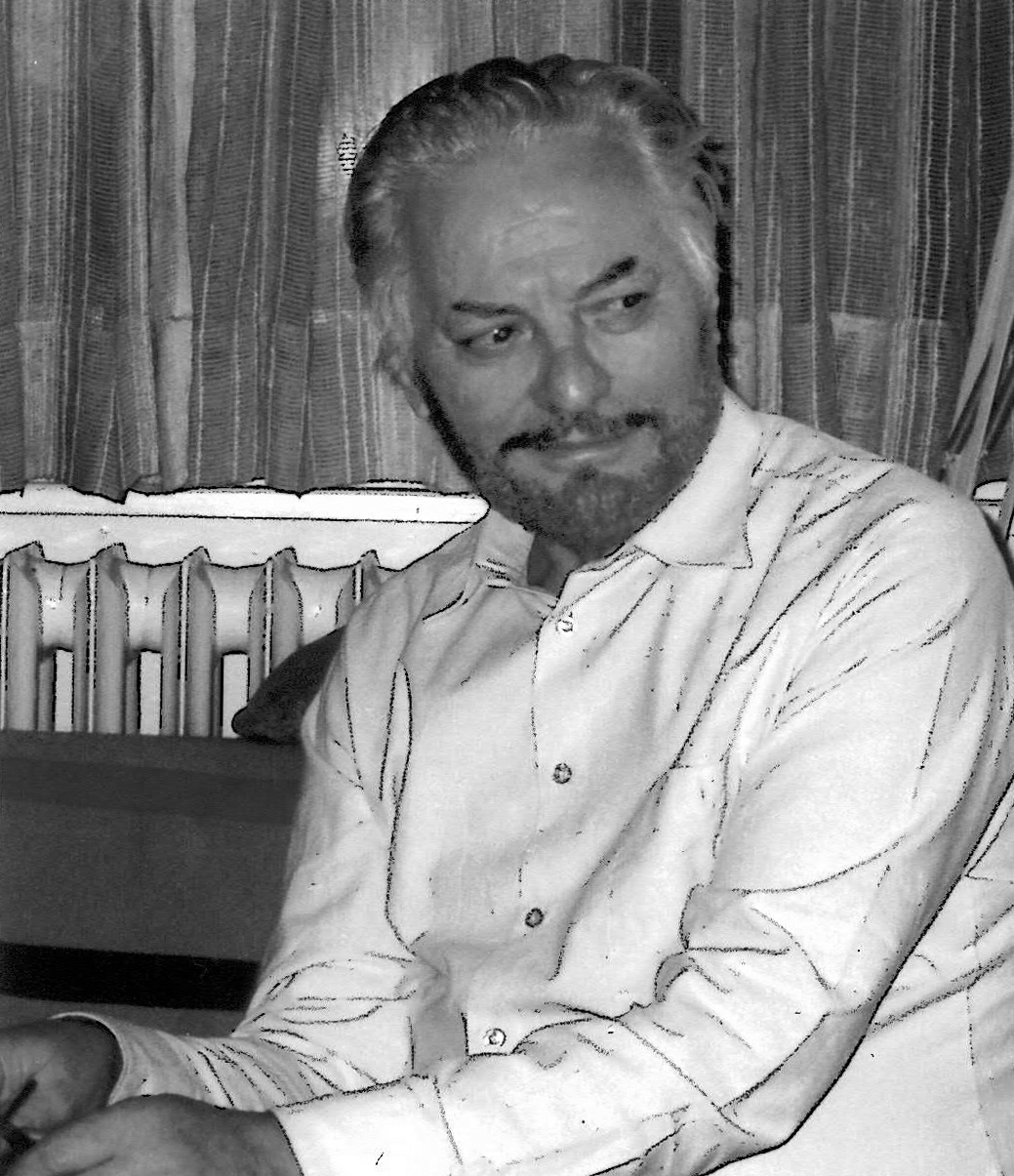
- Rudolf Matutinović
- Born: 27 March 1927; Zaostrog
- Died: 16 April 2014 (aged 87)
- Education: Arts and Crafts School in Zagreb
- Alma mater: Academy of Fine Arts
- Known for: Sculptor
- Spouse: Ljerka Car

Rudolf Matutinović (27 March 1927 – 16 April 2014) was a Croatian sculptor.

== Early childhood and life during the war ==
Rudolf Matutinović was born on 27 March 1927 in the village of Zaostrog, on Makarska Riviera. His father Ante and mother Iva (maiden name Jelačić) had six children - Ivan, Stipe, Ante, Rudolf, Milka and Verđina. From the earliest age, the shapes of rocks, light and shadow play and the lavish colours of nature around Biokovo Mountain fascinated young Rudolf. Even as a small child, he felt the calling to become a sculptor.

At the age of fifteen, he witnessed the horror of war for the first time in August 1942 when the Italian army sentenced the boy Matutinović, along with several other people from the village, to death by execution. They were saved by Franciscan friars from the Zaostrostrog Monastery.

In autumn 1943 he found himself on Hvar Island with the army brigade of Biokovo-Neretva County, and was later sent to El Shatt refugee camp, located in the desert near the Suez Canal. There, along with some partisan duties, he managed to attend an improvised art school, managed by the painter Živko Kljaković from Split. Some other teachers from Split also worked at the school. The natural talent of young Matutinović became immediately obvious. Professor Mate Radmilović even suspected the authenticity of one of his works, attributing it to his colleague professor Kljaković. These successful works were stored in the professor's own portfolio and later exhibited in Cairo. The works have been saved and preserved by Ranko Marinković - an act of special encouragement and great honour for Matutinović.

These pioneer works made during Matutinović's exile in 1944 ('Portrait of Bruno', drawing with chalk; 'Portrait of a man', drawing with chalk) are now on display in Zagreb's Historical and School Museums.

Matutinović lost both his parents during the war. His mother died in 1944, and shortly afterward, after being imprisoned and tortured in an enemy camp in the city of Osijek, his father died in Zaostrog in 1945. After the end of war, Matutinović refused to take up any political position in the youth organization and consequently relinquished any possibility of political and financial support for the study of fine arts. He continued with his work and studies. That same year, he enrolled in the sculpture department of the Arts and Crafts School in Split. In 1948 he graduated from the Arts and Crafts School in Zagreb. His professors were Ivan Mirković and Davorin Hotko.

== Education ==
In 1948 Matutinović passed the entrance exam at the Academy of Fine Arts and began the long-coveted study of sculpture. Among his colleagues were Borka Avramova, Veljko Bodulić, Ivan Mitrović, Boro Mitričevski, Vladimir Dorić, Marijan Kocković and Vera Fišer. Together they made up a very successful generation and many of them remain renowned and praised artists to this day. He studied under Grgo Antunac, Andrija Krstulović, Frano Kršinić, Vjekoslav Rukljač and others. During his college years, in 1951, he sculpted a portrait of his colleague Borka Avramova – his first work of art made in stone (Figure 1).

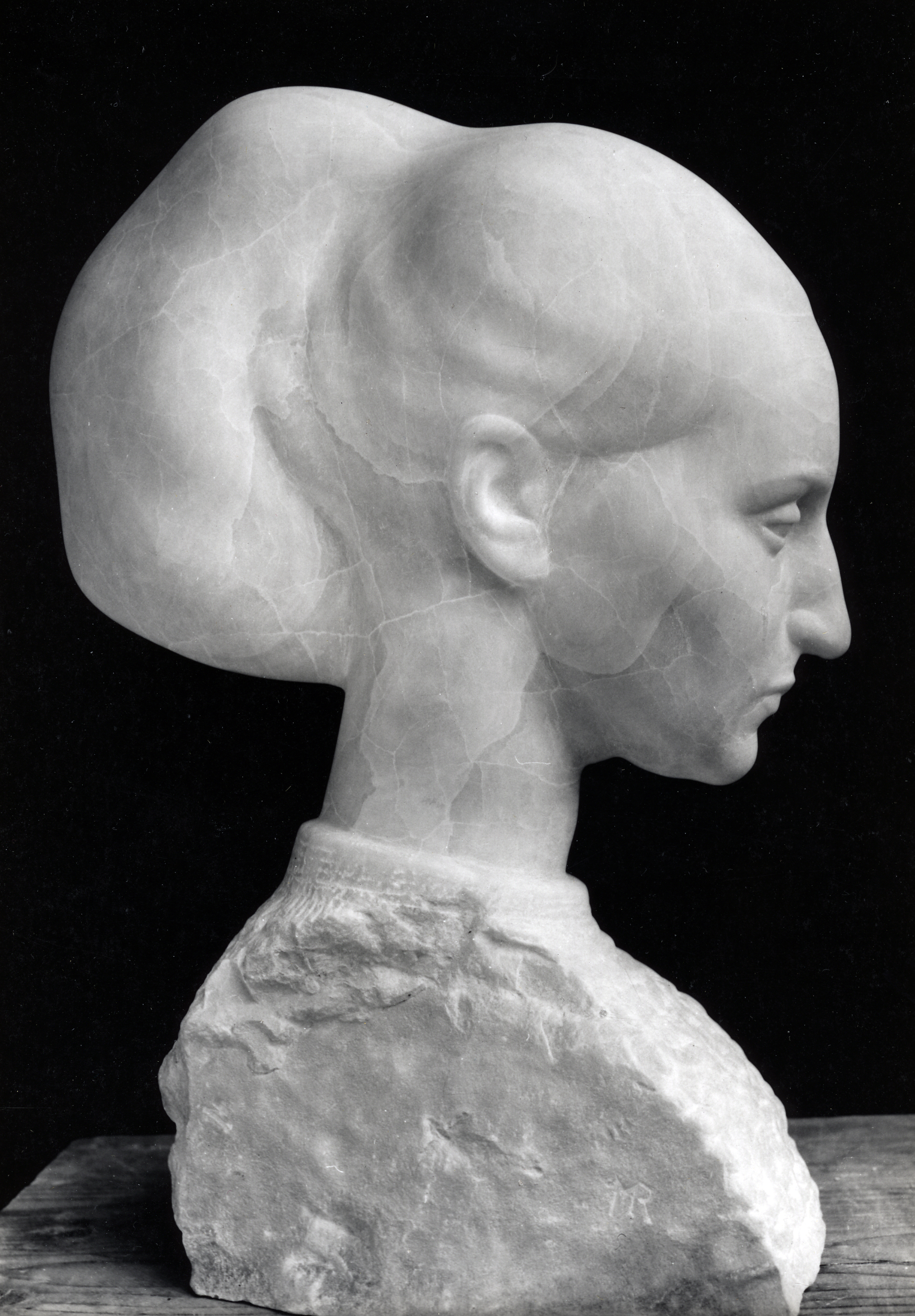
Figure 1 – Borka Avramova

In 1953, he graduated with honours from the class of professor Fran Kršinić. This diploma opened up numerous opportunities to work with great sculptor masters of the time. From 1 July until 1 December he worked as an apprentice in the master shop of sculptor Vanja Radauš. The collaboration between the famous sculptor Radauš and the free-minded young Matutinović was not long-lived. On 15 November 1953 young Matutinović wrote: "Dear Professor, I would hereby like to inform you that I have decided to leave your shop. Thank you for presenting me with the opportunity to work with you. Please forgive me if I have inadvertently done anything to offend you. I would like to thank you once again for everything you have done for me. With all my respect, R. Matutinović. "

On 16 December that year, he received a scholarship from the Federal commission for cultural relations with foreign countries. He continued his studies in Paris from 10 January until 27 March 1954. Not long after, he began his collaboration with professor Fran Kršinić (from 1 May 1954 until 15 September 1958). This postgraduate course earned him a Master of Arts diploma.

== Work and pieces ==
Encouraged by professor Grga Antunc, a friend of Ivan Meštrović, the young sculptor sent photographs of his works to Meštrović. Meštrović’s response arrived shortly afterwards, dated 6 August 1954: "I hereby declare that I shall be happy to accept as talented a sculptor as Rudolf Matutinović to my sculpture department art classes at the University in Syracuse, NY. Professor Ivan Meštrović, Syracuse University, NY.” Matutinović’s trip to the United States did not happen, however - the passionate artist hurt his back while working on a project, and, as he himself noted: "...The questions that I received from the American Embassy in Belgrade had a McCarthyist flavour that did not sit well with an immigrant from a socialist country..."

In 1955 his first exhibition opens in Zagreb. That same year he was admitted to the Croatian Association of Artists. From 10 July to 20 August he studied in Venice and Rome. In 1956 he married Ljerka Car, a famous poet and professor of literature from the town of Crikvenica. His son Igor was born in 1957.

The creative oeuvre of Rudolf Matutinović covered sculpture (portraits, nudes and figure) as well as monuments. He was also engaged in drawing. He modelled medals and illustrated books. The not very large register of sculptural themes recalls the tradition of the old masters one of the characteristics of whom was their concentration on a small number of topics. Such a constraint contributed to the attentive and meticulous workmanship of the statue. That this was really the case with Matutinović is shown by the broad spectrum in the selection of materials – stone, bronze, clay and plaster. He sought his own perfection; he left behind him only those works that he himself considered good.

Human beings were the alpha and omega of Matutinović's sculpture. And within this firm definition, the portrait dominated. This is a most important section of his sculpting oeuvre. And here the artist's choice of model was crucial, for he personally knew all the people he portrayed, and established an emotional relation with his sitters. The modelling sub served the creation of a real image of the person portrayed; it was there to get down to a combined and unified image of the internal and external characteristics of the personality. Every portrait became an artistic and documentary fact as well as a thing of worth. As far as craft skills are concerned, the sculptor Matutinović had mastered them all, but for him personally what was particularly important was the vital strength of the work.

Some of his most famous portraits were done in the period 1957–1970 (‘Portrait of Veljko Despot’; ‘Portrait of boy Perica’; ‘Portrait of Ljerka Car Matutinović’(Figure 2)...)

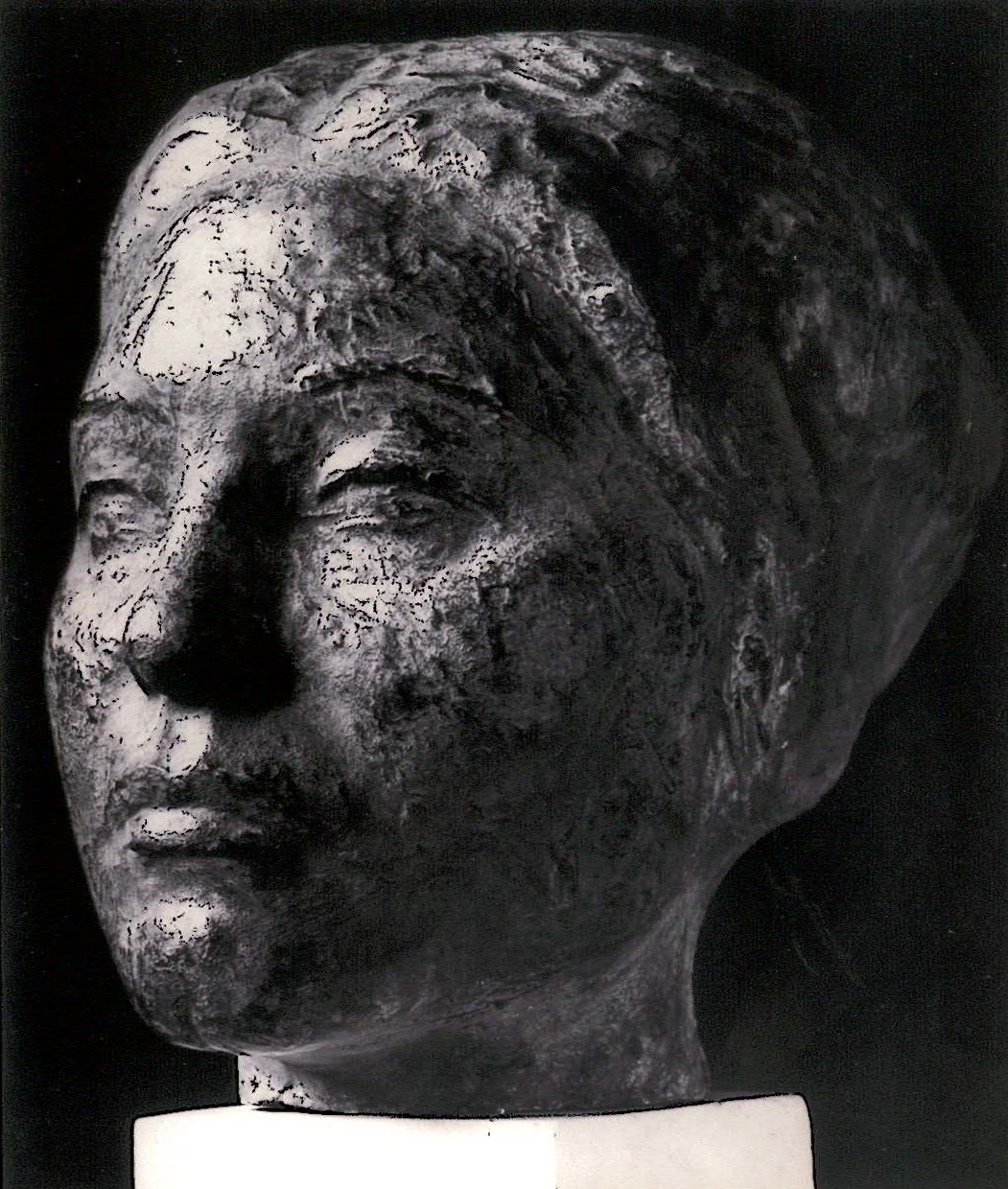
Ljerka Car Matutinović

. At the same time, he starts receiving support from the notable intellectuals of the time – writer and academic Marijan Matković supported his idea to commemorate the suffering and victory of war. He worked on sculptures suitable for galleries, which could bring up interiors and exteriors. He also preferred to have his sculptures on permanent display.

In an interview with the local magazine ‘Vijenac’ in early April 1958 Rudolf Matutinović stated that he would prefer a life of work to a life of exhibitions. This statement quickly becomes the sculptor’s motto, and he continued to live by it until his death.

In 1968, in honour of the sculptor Ivan Mestrović, Matutinović produced a medal, which represents a fragment of the monument to Njegoš on Lovćen Mountain. The tiny medal – only 6 cm in diameter – sought to preserve and highlight Mestrović’s specific artistic qualities. With this gesture, Matutinović has expressed his objections towards abstraction and the new trends that were neglecting the traditional values of arts and crafts.

As well as the portrait work, one should certainly pause on Matutinović's work with the female nude. The body is a challenge to the sculptor. The first thing we notice in the nudes is the sculptorly interest in the sum of impressions in the mass itself. The choice of female body for this artist means less the male evocation of sensuality and beauty, desire and passion, and refers more to the experiencing of various situations in life – Fortune, 1956; Invitation to Love, 1957; Cry of Grief, 1959; Desire, 1972.

By the end of 1980s he has participated in 25 group exhibitions. More than 30 of his works of art in bronze and in stone are exhibited in public, mainly outdoors. In mid-90s, he finally finishes his masterpiece in stone “Longing” (Figure 3)

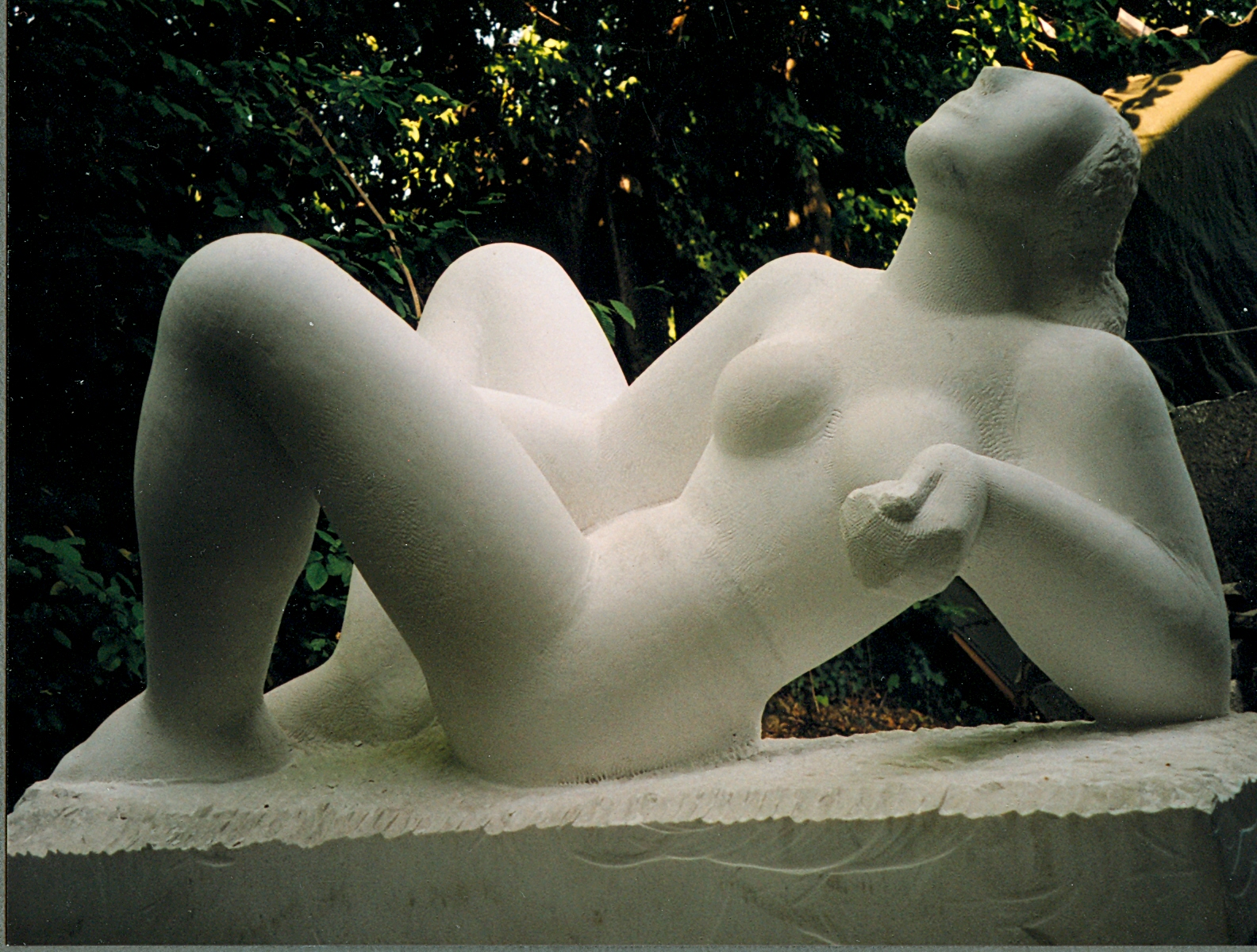
Longing

.

His works are on display in museums, galleries and private collections in Florence, Paris, Hong Kong and New York. He received three awards for his contribution to the development of fine arts. He is also enlisted in the Yugoslav Art Encyclopaedia.

Opportunities often took him away from sculpture and into drawing. He painted family portraits, female nudes and illustrated books of his wife Ljerka Car Matutinović.

In 1980 he created the grandiose monument to fallen soldiers in Zaostrog – ten meters tall, built in white concrete and stone. From the 1960s to 1980s he worked closely with the Croatian Association of Artists (CAA) in Zagreb (the Governing Council and Arts Council) and participated in the work of the National Council for Culture.

In 1996 he participated in the public contest for the monument to Alojzije Stepinac in Krasić. His suggestions were selected by Jasenka Horvat and Tihomir Jukić as the best urban location solution for the monument.

Towards the end of his life, he spent most of his time in the studio working on some new portraits and various versions of older works. In his half century of work, Rudolf Matutinović created a major artistic oeuvre, characterised by knowledge and honesty. He presented himself as painter and sculptor on the thematic journey of the universal and the personal, historical and recent, the intimate and the universally human.
