= Kan Cheong Dunn =

Taiwanese ambassador

- 鄧權昌

Ambassador of Taiwan to Liberia
- In office October 1989 – September 25, 1990
- Preceded by: Cao Yuanxin
- Succeeded by: Xu Cinong

Personal details
- Born: February 28, 1925 Panyu County, Guangdong
- Died: April 19, 2014 (aged 89)
- Spouse: Lin Kwei Fong (1950 in Kaohsiung)
- Children: 6 sons, 6 grandchildren, and two great granddaughters.
- Education: National Chengchi University in Chongqing majoring in Law & Political Science.; Republic of China Naval Academy (Class 1950)

Military service
- Branch/service: Republic of China Navy
- Years of service: 1950 - circa. 1953

Kan Cheong Dunn (February 28, 1925 – April 19, 2014) was a Taiwanese ambassador of Cantonese descent and former naval officer of the ROC Navy.

== Career ==
- He joined the Chinese Navy and received additional training at the U.S. Naval Training School in Miami in communications and anti-submarine warfare.
- He was part of the Chinese crew that sailed former US Navy ships from Miami backed to China during the final days of World War II.
- As the war ended, he entered the Chinese Naval Academy and graduated in 1949.
- In 1950 he was Secretary to Admiral Kwei Yung-ching, Commander-in-Chief of the Republic of China Navy.
- In 1952, he served in the Office of the President as Secretary to the Chief of Staff.
- In 1953, he qualified in the Diplomat Senior Grade Examinations.
- In 1954 he became assistant in the Ministry of Foreign Affairs (MOFA) in Taipei.
- From 1958 to 1960 he was Vice Consul in Davao City, Republic of Philippines.
- From 1960 to 1964 he was Vice Consul in San Francisco.
- In 1964, he was Consul in Los Angeles.
- From 1967 to 1970 he was Consul in New York-
- From 1970 to 1972 he had Execuartur as Consul General in Chicago.
- From 1972 to 1973 he was Deputy Director-General of MOFA Bureau of Consular Affairs.
- In 1973 he became exequartur as Consul General in Houston.
- From 1977 to 1978 he was Director-General of MOFA Department of General Affairs.
- From 1978 to 1979 he was the last Consul General in New York City.
- From 1979 to 1985 he became Director-General of Coordination Council for North American Affairs in New York (later Taipei Economic and Cultural Office in New York, TECO-New York) after the diplomatic recognition from the United States was severed. During his tenure he also represented Taiwan as quasi ambassador next the Headquarters of the United Nations.
- From 1986 to 1987 he was Vice Chairperson of MOFA Research and Planning Committee in Taipei.
- In 1988, he was appointed Representative of the Trade Mission of the Republic of China in Monrovia.
- In October 1989 when the government in Liberia swapped the diplomatic recognition from the government in Beijing to the government in Taipei, he became ambassador to Liberia.
- He stayed for three month in the First Liberian Civil War
- On Sept. 25, 1990 Dunn left the ROC embassy in Monrovia and escaped to the Ivory Coast, bringing his secretary and 15 mainland Chinese with him.
- In 1997, he retired from public service.
