= Ray Colledge =

Raymond Leslie Burrows Colledge (26 May 1922 – 10 April 2014) was an English climber and mountaineer who was a member of the British 1952 Cho Oyu expedition and made the third British ascent of the north face of the Eiger in 1969.

== Early life ==
Colledge was born in Coventry, England. He began climbing after his discharge from the RAF at the end of the Second World War.

== Career ==
Colledge's guideless ascent of a number of difficult routes in the Alps resulted in an invite to join Eric Shipton's Cho Oyu expedition in 1952. The expedition included many climbers who would later form the successful Everest team in 1953. During the expedition, Colledge made the first ascent of a number of lesser peaks and was one of the test subjects who worked closely with the physiologist Griffith Pugh to test oxygen flow rates at altitude. At the time, the Cho Oyu expedition was seen as a failure, Shipton was replaced by John Hunt as leader for the 1953 Everest expedition and Colledge was not asked to join another expedition to the Himalayas.

Colledge continued to climb in the UK and in the Alps. In 1969, in a two-week holiday from his job at Courtaulds in Derby, he made three difficult ascents that brought him to the attention of the British climbing community. Partnering Dan Boon, Colledge made an ascents of the Pear Buttress on Mont Blanc and the Walker Spur on the Grandes Jorasses. Colledge then made the third British ascent of the 1938 route on the north face of the Eiger.

Colledge went on to make many early British ascents of difficult Alpine routes with his friend and climbing partner Dennis Davis.

Colledge died on 10 April 2014.
