= Géza Henni =

Hungarian footballer (1926–2014)

Personal information
- Date of birth: 6 November 1926
- Place of birth: Kiskunhalas, Hungary
- Date of death: 7 April 2014 (aged 87)
- Place of death: Sarasota, Florida
- Position: Goalkeeper

International career
Years	Team	Apps	(Gls)
1948–1953	Hungary	16	(0)

Managerial career
- 1969–1989: Rhode Island Rams

Géza Henni (6 November 1926 – 7 April 2014) was a Hungarian footballer. He played in 16 matches for the Hungary national football team from 1948 to 1953. He was also part of Hungary's squad for the football tournament at the 1952 Summer Olympics, but he did not play in any matches.
