= Vishweshwar Thool =

Indian cricketer (1946–2014)

Personal information
- Born: 1 July 1946; Nagpur, India
- Died: 24 April 2014 (aged 67); Amravati, India
- Source: ESPNcricinfo, 22 April 2016

Vishweshwar Thool (1 July 1946 – 24 April 2014) was an Indian cricketer. He played one first-class match for Vidarbha in 1971/72.
