= Richard Jowett =

English cricketer (1937–2026)

Personal information
- Full name: Richard Lund Jowett
- Born: 29 April 1937; Rawdon, Leeds, Yorkshire, England
- Died: 14 April 2026 (aged 88)
- Batting: Right-handed
- Bowling: Right-arm off-spin

Domestic team information
- Years: Team
- 1957–1960: Oxford University

Career statistics
Competition	First-class
Matches	43
Runs scored	1499
Batting average	20.53
100s/50s	2/6
Top score	122
Balls bowled	1550
Wickets	20
Bowling average	40.10
5 wickets in innings	0
10 wickets in match	0
Best bowling	4/67
Catches/stumpings	44/0
- Source: Cricinfo, 22 August 2018

Richard Lund Jowett (29 April 1937 – 14 April 2026) was a first-class cricketer who played for Oxford University from 1957 to 1960. He later became an orthopaedist.

== Career ==
Jowett was educated at Bradford Grammar School before going up to Magdalen College, Oxford. An aggressive middle-order batsman and off-spin bowler, he was a regular member of the Oxford cricket team for three years from 1957 to 1959, and played two further games in 1960. He was club secretary in 1959.

In his fourth first-class match for Oxford, Jowett scored 105 and 30 not out and took 3 for 50 and 3 for 34 against Free Foresters. Later that season, in a first-class match against D. R. Jardine's XI, he scored 122 in the second innings in a match in which no one else reached 50. Oxford won both matches. He played a few matches for Yorkshire Second XI later that season.

After graduating, Jowett worked as an orthopaedist in Bournemouth.

Jowett died on 14 April 2026, at the age of 88. He and his wife Louise had three sons.
