= Kevin Bokeili =

French writer

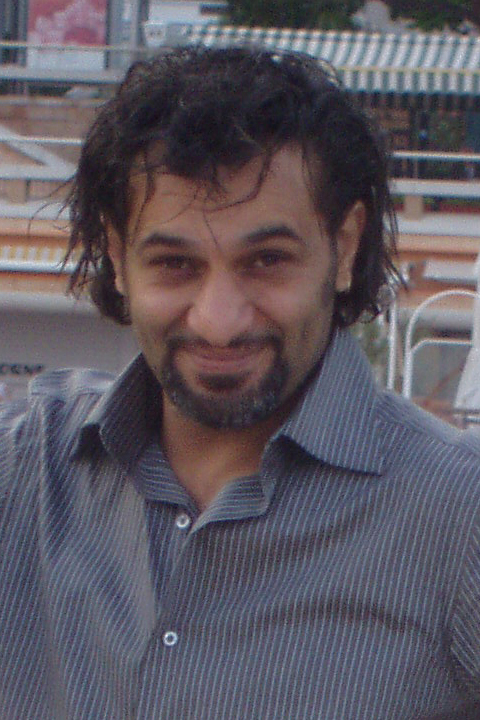
- Kevin Bokeili, Monaco 2007
- Born: 8 February 1963
- Died: 7 April 2014 (aged 51)
- Occupation: writer

Kevin Bokeili (8 February 1963 – 7 April 2014) was a French science fiction writer who was active from 2004 until his death in 2014.

== Biography ==
Bokeili was born in February 1963 and grew up in Geneva, Switzerland, where he studied philosophy. In the early 1990s, he moved to Los Angeles, California where he studied screenplay writing. Enjoying writing about time travel and imagining alternate history and parallel worlds, he tried unsuccessfully to begin a writing career in the film industry.

Established in France in 2000, Bokeili finally turned his English screenplays to French science fiction literature and four of his novels have been published since 2004 by Quatrième Zone Publishing.

== Bibliography ==
Published Literary Work in French

=== Gorck's Land trilogy ===
- The Temple of Salomon|Le Temple de Salomon, 2004, ISBN 2-915-79500-2.
- Xilf Invasion|Invasion Xilf, 2006, ISBN 2-915-79504-5.

=== Timeport series ===
- Chronostation 2044 | Chronogare 2044, 2005, 2-915-79501-0
- Speed & Rock'n Roll, 2008, 2-915-79505-9
