= Hamish Maxwell =

American businessman (1926–2014)

- Born: August 24, 1926; Liverpool, England, United Kingdom
- Died: April 19, 2014 (aged 87); Palm Beach, Florida, U.S.
- Education: Glenalmond College; Trinity Hall, Cambridge
- Occupation: Business executive
- Known for: CEO and Chairman of Philip Morris Companies Inc.
- Spouse: Georgene Mathewson (d. 2013)
- Children: Graham Russell, Robin Maxwell

Hamish Walter Hyslop Maxwell (August 24, 1926 – April 19, 2014) was a British-born American businessman and executive, best known for steering Philip Morris Companies Inc.—now Altria Group—through a period of intensive growth, corporate transformation, and international expansion from 1984 to 1991. As CEO and chairman, Maxwell orchestrated several of the largest and most consequential acquisitions in the company’s history, establishing Philip Morris as one of the world's biggest global consumer products companies.

== Early life and education ==
Maxwell was born in Liverpool, England, to Alexander Maxwell, a senior figure in Britain's tobacco trade who ran a tobacco-importing business and served as Britain’s government tobacco controller during World War II. His mother, Doris Galbraith, came from a prominent Scottish family. Maxwell attended the Glenalmond College in Perthshire, Scotland, where he became an active supporter and benefactor throughout his life, donating funds toward science education and a new organ for the school chapel. After secondary school, Maxwell read history at Trinity Hall, Cambridge between 1944 and 1947, and completed national service in the Royal Air Force.

== Early career ==
Maxwell began his early business career working as a tour agent for Thomas Cook in New York City in the early 1950s. Soon after, his fiancée, Georgene Mathewson, encouraged him to seek a higher-paying position. In 1954, Maxwell joined Philip Morris, marking the start of his long association with the tobacco company.

He quickly distinguished himself in various assignments, including advertising and regional management for Philip Morris’s Asia-Pacific division. Maxwell established himself as an ambitious executive capable of both handling detail and developing brand vision, rising over the years to senior roles overseeing corporate strategy and international expansion. By 1981, he played a key role in securing a 25 percent stake in Rothmans International, outmaneuvering rivals and laying groundwork for the company's global expansion.

== Chairman and CEO of Philip Morris ==
In 1984, Maxwell was appointed chairman and chief executive officer of Philip Morris Companies Inc., a position he would hold until 1991. At the time, Philip Morris had begun diversifying into products in addition to tobacco, starting with the acquisition of Miller Brewing Company in 1969 and 7-Up in 1978. However, under Maxwell’s leadership, the company dramatically accelerated its transformation.

Facing growing concerns about health effects and government restrictions, especially after the ban on TV tobacco advertising, Maxwell recognized the need for aggressive expansion into non-tobacco sectors. In 1985, he led the $5.8 billion acquisition of General Foods, maker of household brands like Jell-O, Birds Eye, Kool-Aid, and Maxwell House coffee. Three years later, he spearheaded the $13 billion takeover of Kraft, a move described as “a coup, with unusually smooth resolution,” which briefly made Philip Morris the world’s largest consumer products company by market capitalization.

Maxwell invited Kraft’s chief executive, John M. Richman, to midnight negotiations at the Westin O’Hare Hotel near Chicago.

Maxwell also modernized the company in other ways, fostering new technology and emphasizing the importance of consumer brands and loyalty. Fortune Magazine named him one of America's “Biggest Bosses,” noting both his shrewd business acumen and humanity.

During his tenure, Maxwell remained a committed advocate for the tobacco industry, publicly defending cigarettes while personally smoking up to two packs a day. He once declared, “Looked at in the context of other alleged health hazards, cigarettes aren’t necessarily dangerous. We like to think we are a very ethical corporation. We don’t have any ethical hangups about cigarette smoking, and I don’t personally.” Notably, he gave up smoking about a decade before his passing, according to family accounts.

== Media relations and influence ==
Maxwell was also instrumental in developing Philip Morris’s approach to reputation management and media strategy. In a confidential 1985 memorandum, later made public through litigation, he outlined a comprehensive strategy to use Philip Morris’s “very considerable clout with the media,” explicitly referencing advertising relationships with powerful proprietors such as Rupert Murdoch and Malcolm Forbes, both described as “sympathetic to our position.” The memo urged leveraging advertising revenue to influence news coverage, while an appendix noted that Murdoch's papers “rarely publish anti-smoking articles these days.” These revelations highlighted Maxwell’s pivotal role in shaping the public relations landscape of the tobacco sector and drew critical attention from investigative journalists and public health advocates. During his time as CEO, Philip Morris’s reputation management and media relations brought together business and news interests in ways that later became controversial, with effects still debated in contemporary regulatory and legal discussions.

== Later career, succession controversy, and corporate realignment ==
Maxwell retired from Philip Morris in 1991 and was succeeded by Michael A. Miles, the former chairman and CEO of Kraft General Foods, which Maxwell had helped bring into the company. Miles, the first non-smoking head of Philip Morris, faced industry-wide turmoil, as tobacco companies came under intensified Congressional and public scrutiny regarding health risks and past practices. During his brief, tumultuous leadership (1991–1994), Miles signed off on drastic cigarette price cuts, presided over the largest job reductions in company history, and considered splitting the conglomerate into food and tobacco businesses—a proposal that had strong support among investors hoping to shield Kraft from tobacco liabilities. Former chairman Maxwell, reported to have “plunged back into the company's operations,” played a key role in successfully opposing the breakup. Analysts and industry insiders speculated that Maxwell's intervention heavily influenced the board's decision to keep the company unified, contributing to Miles' abrupt resignation. After Miles’ departure, Geoffrey Bible and R. William Murray, both veteran Philip Morris executives, took over the company’s leadership.

Outside of business, Maxwell was a philanthropic supporter of education and the arts, notably the Brooklyn Academy of Music. He maintained strong ties to Glenalmond College and Trinity Hall, Cambridge, and contributed to several causes related to his Scottish heritage.

== Personal life ==
Maxwell was known for his loyalty, attention to detail, and quiet but persuasive demeanour, colleaguess often remarked on his unobtrusive voice and intense focus. He enjoyed family life, opera, and splitting his time between homes in Brooklyn Heights, Palm Beach, and Quogue on Long Island. Maxwell was married to Georgene Mathewson for 58 years until her death in 2013; he is survived by two daughters, Graham Russell and Robin Maxwell, four grandchildren, and his sister Hilary Harding.

== Death and legacy ==
Maxwell died of bladder cancer at his home in Palm Beach, Florida, on April 19, 2014, aged 87. His leadership and legacy, and the acquisitions he oversaw, significantly shaped the strategic direction and global footprint of Philip Morris. After Maxwell’s era, the company spun off and sold many of his acquisitions, including the sale of Miller Brewing and Kraft, and rebranded itself as Altria Group in 2003, again focusing its efforts on tobacco and related products.

Maxwell’s legacy at Philip Morris was marked by transformative corporate acquisitions that established new standards for global brand building and diversification. Business journalists described Maxwell as "one of the world’s outstanding marketers" and "a consummate dealmaker," with industry commentators noting how his leadership shifted the company's focus from tobacco to consumer products, even as it later reversed these strategic moves. Analysts highlighted his reputation for managing complex negotiations and cultivating loyalty among colleagues, which earned him significant respect within international business circles. Maxwell also played a pivotal role in developing Philip Morris’s media and public relations strategy. His approach to leveraging advertising relationships and influencing news coverage left a lasting imprint on corporate reputation management.
