= Ratchanee Sripraiwan =

Ratchanee Sripraiwan (Thai: รัชนี ศรีไพรวรรณ, 11 March 1930 – 15 April 2014) was a Thai language scholar, writer and academic. She was the author of Mana Manee Piti Choojai, a series of Thai language textbooks which were used in primary schools throughout Thailand for grades 1 through 6 from 1978 until 1994. Her books were also used to create Thai language curriculum in Australia. She was awarded the Narathip Award in 2013 for her contributions.

Sripraiwan was born in Kosum Phisai District, Maha Sarakham Province, Thailand. She attended primary school and elementary school in Maha Sarakham Province. She then attended Wang Chankasem teacher training school. She also studied at College of Education, which is now known as Srinakharinwirot University, in Bangkok.

Ratchanee Sripraiwan died at Vichaiyuth Hospital in Bangkok on 15 April 2014, at the age of 84.

In 2016, she was featured as a Google Doodle on what would have been her 86th birthday.
