= Barry Sterling =

American businessman and politician

Member of the Tennessee House of Representatives from the 83rd district
- In office 1979–1983
- Preceded by: Harold Sterling
- Succeeded by: Joe Kent

Personal details
- Born: November 17, 1943
- Died: April 19, 2014 (aged 70) Memphis, Tennessee, U.S.
- Party: Republican
- Website: House website

Barry Evan Sterling (November 17, 1943 – April 19, 2014) was an American businessman and politician.

From Memphis, Tennessee, Sterling co-owned Sterling Company Realtors and was a probation officer in the juvenile court system. He served in the Tennessee House of Representatives for Shelby County (District 83) as a Republican. He served in the 91st and 92nd General Assemblies. He died April 19, 2014 at the VA Hospital.

== Personal life ==
Sterling had a single sibling, brother Harold Sterling, Jr., and two children, daughter Britain Lenz (Adam) and son Justice Sterling (Janece). His grandchildren include Ryan Elizabeth Lenz and a child referred to simply as "Baby Lenz."

== Community Work ==
Sterling was a member various local organizations, including the American Legion; the Jaycees; Kiwanis; Southern Folklore, Inc.; the Germantown Arts Association; the Germantown Festival Association; the Art League; the National Association of Realtors; Realtors National Marketing; the Home Builders Association; the Easter Seal Society; the 1977 Constitutional Convention; and was president of the Germantown Theater in 1981. He was a lifetime member of the Multi-Million Dollar Realtor’s Sales Club.
