= Willi Kafel =

Austrian gymnast (1930–2014)

- Born: 6 July 1930 Vuzenica, Slovenia
- Died: 2 April 2014 (aged 83)

Gymnastics career
- Discipline: Men's artistic gymnastics
- Country represented: Austria

Willi Kafel (6 July 1930 – 2 April 2014) was an Austrian gymnast. He competed in eight events at the 1960 Summer Olympics. Kafel died on 2 April 2014, at the age of 83.
