= Norman Kelvin =

American literary scholar

- Born: August 27, 1924; Brooklyn, New York City
- Died: April 14, 2014 (aged 89); New York, New York
- Awards: Guggenheim Fellowship (1974)

Academic background
- Education: Columbia University (BA, MPhil, PhD)

Academic work
- Discipline: English literature
- Institutions: Rutgers University; Columbia University; City College of New York; Graduate Center, CUNY

Norman Kelvin (August 27, 1924 – April 14, 2014) was an American scholar of English. He was Distinguished Professor of English at City College of New York and Graduate Center, CUNY. Kelvin was a recipient of a 1974 Guggenheim Fellowship.

== Biography ==
Kelvin was born in Brooklyn on August 27, 1924. He received a scholarship to Columbia University and attended Columbia until he entered the United States Army in 1943, serving in the United States Medical Corps in Clinton, Iowa and the Philippines. After being discharged from the army, Kelvin returned to Columbia as a pre-medical student. He later switched to literature and received his B.A. in 1948, M.Phil. in 1950, and Ph.D. in English and comparative literature in 1960. His doctoral dissertation focused on British novelist George Meredith.

Kelvin taught at Rutgers University and Columbia as a graduate student and began teaching in City College of New York in 1961, remaining at the institution until he retired in 2006. He wrote on the works of novelist E. M. Forster and was known for his four-volume edited edition of The Letters of William Morris, supported by a National Endowment for the Humanities fellowship.

Kelvin retired from teaching in 2006 and died on April 14, 2014.
