= William Hird =

Australian cricketer

Personal information
- Born: 23 September 1921; Stanley, County Durham, England
- Died: 15 April 2014 (aged 92); Longford, Tasmania, Australia

Domestic team information
- Years: Team
- 1952-1961: Tasmania
- Source: Cricinfo, 10 March 2016

William Hird (23 September 1921 – 15 April 2014) was an Australian cricketer. He played eighteen first-class matches for Tasmania between 1952 and 1961.

== See also ==
- List of Tasmanian representative cricketers
