= Tony Ninos =

American politician

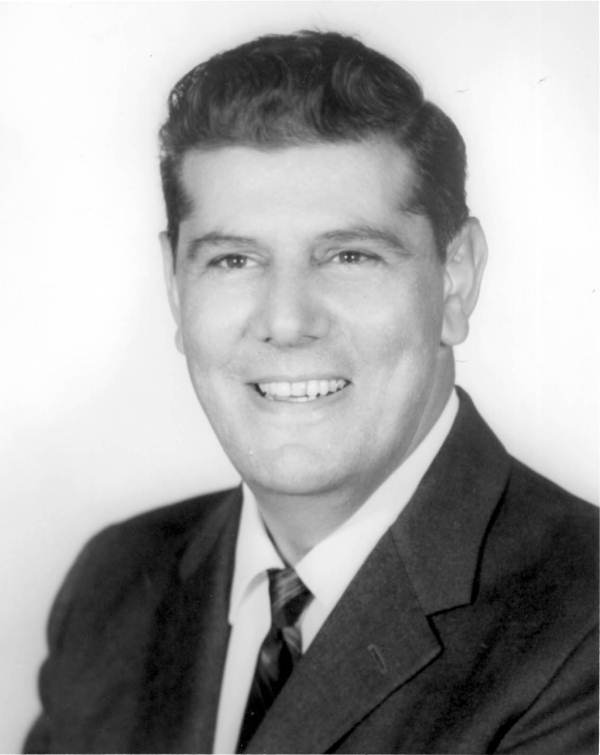
Ninos in 1967

Anthony Ninos (February 7, 1919 – April 26, 2014) was an American businessman and politician.

== Biography ==
Ninos was born in Lockport, New York. He received his bachelor's degree in ceramic engineering from Alfred University. He served in the United States Army during World War II.

In 1949, Nino moved to Cocoa, Florida, where he owned and operated the Brevard Hotel. Ninos served on the Cocoa City Council and then served as mayor, from 1959 until 1963. He then served in the Florida House of Representatives in 1967 as a Democrat. He died in Cocoa, Florida.
