= Essie Garrett =

American ultramarathon runner

Essie Garrett (1947 – 1 April 2014) was an American ultramarathon runner and refrigeration mechanics instructor at Emily Griffith Opportunity School in Denver, Colorado.

== Biography ==
Raised in Riesel, Texas, Garrett joined the Army at age 16 and served for three years before settling in Denver.

Since 1981, Garrett is estimated to have run 25,000 miles and raised over $1 million for charity. Beneficiaries include Children's Hospital Colorado, Colorado AIDS Project, Denver Rescue Mission, Emily Griffith Foundation, Max Funds Animal Adoption Center, Rainbow House and Sacred Heart House. Every Thanksgiving since 1991 she has run for 48 hours in laps around the Colorado Capitol building to raise money for the homeless.

== Political and philosophical views ==
Garrett was a follower of Sri Chinmoy and maintained a vegetarian diet.

== Awards ==
- 1992: Hall of Fame inductee, Sportswomen of Colorado
- 1996: Olympic torchbearer for the state of Colorado
