= James Bates (conductor) =

American organist and conductor

- Born: November 16, 1952; Pittsburgh
- Died: April 4, 2014 (aged 61); Pittsburgh
- Education: Susquehanna University; Yale School of Music
- Occupations: Conductor; Organist; Academic teacher

James Bates (November 16, 1952 – April 4, 2014) was an American organist and conductor, especially of Early music and Baroque music.

Born in Pittsburgh, Bates studied at the Susquehanna University and continued at the Yale School of Music where he focused on organ and choral conducting. He recorded several Bach cantatas with the ensemble Carolina Baroque. He served as an academic teacher at Salem College, Greensboro College, and Averett University.
