= Andrei Aleksenko =

Russian Scientist

- Андрей Алексенко
- Born: Andrei Gennadievich Aleksenko; Андрей Геннадьевич Алексенко; 24 January 1934; Moscow
- Died: 7 April 2014 (aged 80); Moscow
- Occupation: specialist in the field of microcircuitry technology

Andrei Gennadievich Aleksenko (Russian: Андрей Геннадьевич Алексенко; born 24 January 1934 — 7 April 2014) was a Russian scientist, professor and a specialist in the field of microcircuitry technology.

== Biography ==
Andrei Gennadievich Aleksenko was born on 24 January 1934 in Moscow. His father, Gennady Vasilievich Aleksenko was the Minister of Industry of Communications of the USSR in 1947—1953. In 1957, Andrei Aleksenko graduated from Moscow Power Engineering Institute. From 1957 to 1990 he worked at Research Institute-885 (now — Joint Stock Company "Russian Space Systems").

He participated in the creation of the first transistor transceiver in USSR that transmitted to the Earth the photos of the reverse side of the Moon.

For his merits in creating samples of new technology in August 1986 he was awarded the title of Hero of Socialist Labor and the Order of Lenin by the Decree of the Presidium of the Supreme Soviet of the USSR.

Since 1962, he taught at Moscow State Mining Institute. From 1965 to 2004 he was an associate professor at Moscow Engineering Physics Institute. Since 2005 he also taught at Moscow Power Engineering Institute.

He was Professor (1975) and Doctor of Technical Sciences (1973), Academician of International Higher Education Academy of Sciences (2002) and Academy of Electrotechnical Sciences of the Russian Federation (2006).

He died in Moscow on 7 April 2014.

== Literature ==
- Космонавтика и ракетостроение России : Биографическая энциклопедия. — М., 2011.
- Электроника России : Биографическая энциклопедия. — 2009.
