= Andrew Intamba =

Namibian politician and diplomat

Andrew "Bongi" Intamba (14 April 1947 – 8 April 2014) was a Namibian politician and diplomat. Intamba served as the country's Director of the Central Intelligence Service from 1991 until 2007. He then joined the Ministry of Foreign Affairs as a diplomat in February 2008. President Hifikepunye Pohamba appointed Intamba as Namibia's first Ambassador to Egypt in 2008, a position he held until his death. He was awarded the Order of Namibia Eagle 2nd Class medal in 2004. He had a wife, Johanna Intamba, with whom he had four daughters and a son.

Intamba died of a short illness at the Rhino Park hospital in Windhoek, Namibia, on 8 April 2014, at the age of 67.
