= Richard Greenfield =

Richard Greenfield (April 19, 1942 – April 16, 2014) was an American publisher.

"Ricky" Greenfield owned and published the Jewish Ledger from 1994 until 2013. He bought the original stake in 1992, and the entire ownership stake in 1994. He sold the paper to Henry M. Zachs in June 2013.

The Jewish Ledger is headquartered in Hartford, Connecticut and has a weekly circulation of approximately 35,000.

Greenfield was known as an "objective and free thinker and a staunch supporter of Israel."

Greenfield died while visiting his grandchildren in San Francisco, California on April 16, 2014.
