= Marsden Wagner =

American perinatologist and public health administrator (1930–2014)

Marsden Wagner (23 February 1930 – 27 April 2014), was a perinatologist and perinatal epidemiologist from California who served as a Director of Maternal and Child Health for the California State Health Department, Director of the University of Copenhagen-UCLA Health Research Center, and Director of Women's and Children's Health for the World Health Organization. He was an outspoken supporter of midwifery.

== Career ==
Marsden Wagner was born in 1930 in San Francisco. He studied at the University of California at Los Angeles, earning an M.D., clinical specialty training in pediatrics, perinatology (neonatology and obstetrics) and an advanced scientific degree in perinatal science. Following several years of full-time clinical practice and some years as a full-time faculty member at UCLA, he became a Director of Maternal and Child Health for the California State Health Department. After six years in Denmark as Director of the University of Copenhagen-UCLA Health Research Center, he was for 15 years Director of Women's and Children's Health for the World Health Organization, during which time he chaired the three consensus conferences convened by WHO on appropriate technology around the time of birth. The 1985 WHO study Having a Baby in Europe, for which he was chair of the working party, was based on survey responses from 23 European countries and revealed great differences in practises.

With extensive experience in maternity care in industrialized countries, including midwifery and the appropriate use of technology during pregnancy and birth, he consulted and lectured in over 50 countries and gave testimony before the US Congress, British Parliament, French National Assembly, Italian Parliament, Russian Parliament and others.

Wagner was an outspoken supporter of midwifery; in 1995 he published an article in The Lancet describing a "global witch-hunt" against home birth. In a 1997 article he described how his dissatisfaction with the medical establishment developed during his graduate studies and led to his further study in public health and eventually to his advocacy for midwives.

== Publications ==
His publications, in eleven different languages, include 131 scientific papers, 20 book chapters and 14 books, including Pursuing the Birth Machine (1994), credited with creating a social model of birth, and Creating Your Birth Plan (2006) His Born in the USA (2006) was described as a "scathing attack on professional standards of care" in The Women's Review of Books; a reviewer in JAMA, while recognizing some of Wagner's arguments as valid, found "inaccuracies and misleading statements" and a lack of solid evidence that the proposed solutions would be beneficial.
