= Robin Capell =

South African cricketer (1934–2014)

Personal information
- Born: 30 September 1934; Port Elizabeth, South Africa
- Died: 12 April 2014 (aged 79); Port Elizabeth, South Africa
- Source: ESPNcricinfo, 13 May 2016

Robin Capell (30 September 1934 – 12 April 2014) was a South African cricketer. He played four first-class matches for Eastern Province between 1955 and 1958.
