= Tim Moran =

American politician (1918–2014)

Tim Moran (August 8, 1918 – April 18, 2014) was an American educator and politician.

Born in Spanish Fork, Utah, Moran served in the United States Army Air Forces during World War II. Moran received his bachelor's and master's degrees in education from Brigham Young University. Moran taught school and was an elementary school principal. Moran served on the Spanish Fork City Council and then as Mayor of Spanish Fork. He then served in the Utah House of Representatives as a Democrat from 1984 until 1996. Moran died in Payson, Utah.
