= Jim W. Brown =

Australian rules footballer, born 1926

Jim Brown

Personal information
- Full name: Jim Brown
- Born: 18 December 1926
- Died: 8 April 2014 (aged 87)
- Original team: Ivanhoe
- Height: 187 cm (6 ft 2 in)
- Weight: 84 kg (185 lb)

Playing career^{1}
Years	Club	Games (Goals)
1945, 1947	Fitzroy	10 (5)
- ^{1} Playing statistics correct to the end of 1947.

Jim Brown (18 December 1926 – 8 April 2014) was a former Australian rules footballer who played with Fitzroy in the Victorian Football League (VFL).

In 1948 Brown moved to Tasmania and played with New Norfolk in the Tasmanian Football League. He won the William Leitch Medal, the competition Best and Fairest that year.
