= Daniel S. Koltun =

American theoretical physicist (1933-2014)

- Born: December 7, 1933
- Died: April 9, 2014 (aged 80); Haverford, Pennsylvania, U.S.
- Burial place: West Laurel Hill Cemetery, Bala Cynwyd, Pennsylvania, U.S.
- Education: Harvard University; Princeton University
- Known for: Koltun sum rule
- Awards: Guggenheim Fellowship (1976)
- Scientific career
- Fields: Nuclear physics
- Workplaces: University of Rochester

Daniel Scherwin Koltun (December 7, 1933 – April 9, 2014) was an American theoretical physicist. His work focused on the many-body theory and nuclei sub-components including mesons, pions, and quarks. He created the "Koltun Sum Rule" which was used in the measurement of electron scattering.

== Education ==
Koltun graduated in 1955 from Harvard University with a bachelor's degree and in 1961 from Princeton University with a Ph.D. in physics with a thesis in New methods of spectroscopy applied to the nuclear 1-p shell.

== Career ==
In 1962 he joined the University of Rochester's physics faculty and worked there until his retirement in 2004 as professor emeritus.

His research focused on nuclear structure; intermediate and high energy reactions; and the many-body theory. He studied nuclei as a many-body system with components such as mesons, pions, and quarks. His work resulted in the "Koltun Sum Rule" which was used in measurement of electron scattering from nuclear targets.

He was a visiting staff member at Los Alamos Meson Physics Facility over a span of 18 years and served on the Facility's Program Advisory Committee. He was a visiting fellow at the Weizmann Institute of Science and at the Niels Bohr Institute. He was a visiting professor from 1976 to 1977 at Tel Aviv University and in 1985 at the Hebrew University of Jerusalem.

Koltun was awarded the Sloan Research Fellowship, the Guggenheim Fellowship, and the NSF Postdoctoral Fellowship. He was elected a Fellow of the American Physical Society.

He died April 9, 2014, in Haverford, Pennsylvania, and was interred at West Laurel Hill Cemetery in Bala Cynwyd, Pennsylvania.

== Selected publications ==
- with Judah M. Eisenberg: Theory of Meson Interactions with Nuclei. New York: Wiley. 1980; 403 pages
- with Judah M. Eisenberg: Quantum Mechanics of Many Degrees of Freedom. New York: Wiley. 1988. ISBN 0471888427; pbk, 313 pages
