= Yukio Takefuta =

Japanese English education scholar (1935–2014)

- Born: May 20, 1935; Chiba, Japan
- Died: April 30, 2014 (aged 78)
- Education: Chiba University; The Ohio State University (Ph.D.)
- Known for: the Three-step Auditory Comprehension Approach (3 Step System)
- Awards: Japan Association of College English Teachers (JACET) academic award (1984); The Japan Association for Language Education & Technology (LET) academic award (2007)
- Scientific career
- Fields: English Education
- Doctoral advisor: John W. Black (The Ohio State University)

Yukio Takefuta (竹蓋 幸生) (May 20, 1935 – April 30, 2014) was a Japanese English education scholar. Professor Emeritus of Chiba University, he devoted his life to the study and research of English phonetics, English education, and systems engineering, thus advancing English education in Japanese institutions of higher education. He served as a board member for universities and academic societies. He was awarded the Senior Fourth Rank (Shoshii) and the Order of the Sacred Treasures in 2014 for his notable contributions to the scientific approach to learning.

He developed an English education integrated system known as "Three-step Auditory Comprehension Approach" (3 Step System). This system included Computer-assisted Language Learning (CALL) materials based on the concept or system of multilateral feedback. When compared to traditional methods, the learner outcomes for the "Three-step Auditory Comprehension Approach" verified positive learning experiences, resulting in it being used in higher education institutions throughout Japan.

Takefuta and three research collaborators were awarded The Japan Association for Language Education & Technology Academic Prize in 2007 for the development, application, and evaluation of the system, "Three-step Auditory Comprehension Approach."

== Education ==
- March 1958: Chiba University, Faculty of Education, Training Division for Junior High School Teachers (English education), B.A.
- December 1964: The Ohio State University, Department of Speech and Hearing Sciences, M.A.
- December 1966: The Ohio State University, Department of Speech and Hearing Sciences, Ph.D.

== Professional career ==
- April 1958 – August 1959, Chiba Prefecture, Yokaichiba Municipal Central Junior High School. (English teacher)
- September 1959 – June 1966, Chiba Prefecture, Sosa Senior High School. (English teacher)
- January 1967 – June 1968, The Ohio State University, Department of Speech and Hearing Science (research associate)
- September 1967 – June 1968, The Ohio State University, Department of Speech (visiting associate professor)
- July 1968 – October 1969, Chiba University, Faculty of Education (instructor)
- October 1969 – December 1977, Chiba University, Faculty of Education (assistant professor)
- June 1970 – August 1970, The Ohio State University, Department of Speech (research associate)
- September 1970 – January 1971, University of Hawaii, Department of Literature and Science (visiting associate professor)
- February 1971 – June 1971, The Ohio State University, Department of Speech (visiting associate professor)
- October 1972 – June 1974, The Ohio State University (associate professor)
- June 1976 – March 1978, Osaka University, School of Language and Culture (associate professor)
- January 1978 – March 2001, Chiba University, Faculty of Education (professor)
- April 1978 – March 1979, Osaka University (professor)
- April 2001 – March 2009, Bunkyo Gakuin University (professor)
- April 2003 – March 2005, Bunkyo Gakuin University, Faculty of Foreign Studies (academic dean)
- April 2005 – March 2009, Bunkyo Gakuin University, The School of Foreign Studies (chairperson)

== Achievements ==
=== Education and research ===
For 47 years, Yukio Takefuta had been a leading researcher who continued to develop his original research in fields such as English phonetics, English education, systems engineering, and educational technology. He authored a number of academic textbooks and published numerous research papers. He was one of the first to establish the development of global human resources as a goal for university and graduate school students and produced a large number of young and competent researchers and human resources who are active both nationally and internationally.

He received the Japan Association of College English Teachers (JACET) Award in 1984 for publishing Nihonjin Eigo no Kagaku [A Scientific Observation of Japanese English] and Hiaringu no Koudou Kagaku [A Scientific Observation of Listening in Action] which summarized research that became the basis for scientific English education and other related fields.

In 1991, based upon his pioneering research, he created a unique teaching theory called the Three-step Auditory Comprehension Approach (3 Step System) which increases the effectiveness of English listening skills and vocabulary skills training. This 3 Step System combines a broad expanse of academic knowledge with an interdisciplinary or integrated approach.

In 1996, an award from the Japan Association of College English Teachers (JACET) was presented to the practical training that was put in practice in the Center for Language Education, Chiba University through using the CALL teaching materials (Computer-assisted Language Learning courseware) developed by the graduates of Takefuta's research laboratory based on the 3 Step System. He also received a poster prize, Chiba University's Open Research ‘99, from the university's president for the practical report of the students he taught in the educational department of Chiba University. Starting from 2000, he served as the research representative for the Research of Foreign Language CALL Teaching Material Advances which received the Grant-in-Aid for Scientific Research on Priority Areas by the Ministry of Education, Culture, Sports, Science and Technology (MEXT), and the CALL materials have been used widely in many educational institutes since 2001.

The research on the development, application and evaluation of the system of the Three-step Auditory Comprehension Approach received the academic award in 2007 from the Japan Association for Language Education and Technology.

=== Educational administration ===
During the establishment of the Graduate School of Education (MA) in April 1982 and the Graduate School of Science and Technology (Ph.D.) in April 1986, Takefuta participated in the enhancement and development of a graduate school of Chiba University by serving as vice chairman of Chiba University Graduate School of Education's establishment committee. He was also assigned to the Chiba University Graduate School general problem investigating committee by the president of Chiba University.

During the reorganization of the Chiba University's College of Liberal Arts, Chiba University's then president, Ryo Yoshida, requested the committee the installment of the Center for Foreign Languages (Currently referred as the Center for Language Education) centering on CALL system based teaching. Not only did Takefuta fulfill this request, but also actively participated in the university's reformation.

Takefuta was principal of the Attached Junior High School of Education, Chiba University for the period 1989–1994. He also participated in the development and reformation of university education and research as well as participating in the development, enhancement and operation of the Attached Junior High School of Education. For his dedication and outstanding achievements he made for these local education administrations, he received an award presented by MEXT in October 2008.

=== Academic society and social activities ===
Takefuta was a councilor for both the Japanese Phonetic Society of Japan and the JACET, and also served as a member of the steering committee and a councilor for the Japan Association for Language Education and Technology's Kanto Chapter while holding prominent positions in various research groups and learned societies. He also gave numerous presentations on his research both domestically and internationally and contributed to the academic society greatly through his original and remarkable academic works.

In addition to his contribution to the academic society, Takefuta served as a longtime English instructor course's lecturer for the MEXT (1982–2000), a member of the Open University of Japan's Center of ICT and Distance Education (CODE) multimedia teaching materials development committee, and the advisor of multimedia teaching materials creative team, as well as person of reference for the House of Councilors' investigation committee of national life.

He contributed to the promotion of education in other countries by serving as a member of the editing committee for the American academic journal, Journal of Psycholinguistic Research. He was a consultant at the Ohio state health service bureau, an associate professor for The Ohio State University and the University of Hawaii. In addition, he was also an examiner for the Fulbright foreign student oral examination.

=== Awards ===
- The Japan Association of College English Teachers (JACET) academic award, 1984
- Chiba University Open Research'99 poster award, 1999
- The Japan Association for Language Education & Technology (LET) academic award, 2007
- The Local Educational Administration Contributor award (presented by the Minister of Education, Culture, Sports, Science and Technology), 2008
- Senior Fourth Rank (Shoshii), the Order of the Sacred Treasure, 2014

== Works ==
=== Publications ===
- Takefuta, Yukio (1981). コンピューターの見た現代英語: ボキャブラリーの科学 [Computer analysis of contemporary English: Quantitative study of vocabulary] (in Japanese). Educa Publishing.
- Takefuta, Yukio (1982). 日本人英語の科学 [Science of Japanese English] (in Japanese). Kenkyūsha. ISBN 978-4327410223.
- Takefuta, Yukio (1984). ヒアリングの行動科学―実践的指導と評価への道標 [Behavioral science of listening comprehension: Practical teaching and evaluation] (in Japanese). Kenkyūsha. ISBN 978-4327410230.
- Takefuta, Yukio (1989). ヒアリングの指導システム―効果的な指導と評価の方法 [A system for teaching listening comprehension: Effective teaching and evaluation methods] (in Japanese). Kenkyūsha. ISBN 978-4327410292.
- Takefuta, Yukio (1997). 英語教育の科学―コミュニケーション能力の養成を目指して [Science of English language teaching: For the development of communication abilities] (in Japanese). ALC Press. ISBN 978-4872346381.

=== Publications (multi-authored) ===
- Takefuta, Yukio, ed. (1986). 英語教師のパソコン―研究・指導・情報収集・事務処理向上のために [Personal computing for English teachers: For better research, instruction, information gathering, office work] (in Japanese). Educa Publishing. ISBN 978-4870060043.
- Takefuta, Yukio, ed. (1987). 英語科のCAI 英語教師のパソコン II [English CAI: Personal computing for English teachers II] (in Japanese). Educa Publishing. ISBN 9784870060067.
- Hasegawa, Kiyoshi; Shimaoka, Takashi; Takefuta, Yukio; et al., eds. (1988). プロシード英和辞典 [Proceed English-Japanese dictionary] (in Japanese). Fukutake Shoten.
- Takefuta, Yukio; Suiko, Masanori, eds. (2005). これからの大学英語教育―CALLを活かした指導システムの構築 [The future of college level English language education: Using CALL to construct a teaching system] (in Japanese). Iwanami Shoten. ISBN 978-4000228541.

=== Authorized high school textbooks (multi-authored) ===
- POLESTAR English Course I, Suken Publishing, 1993
- Listen to the World OC-B, Kyoiku Publishing, 1994
- POLESTAR English Course II, Suken Publishing, 1994
- Revised POLESTAR English Course, Suken Publishing, 1997
- Listen to the World OC-B, New Edition, Kyoiku Publishing, 1997
- Revised POLESTAR English Course, Suken Publishing, 1998

=== CALL teaching material for university students and adults (supervising editor) ===
Takefuta oversaw the making of all the 27 materials listed below. These materials are based on the Three-step Auditory Comprehension Approach and are made as teaching theories for effectively training English listening skills. Each set requires 30 hours of learning time.

- Listenovate, NEC, 1993
- Listenovate for Windows, NEC Informatec Systems, 1996
- College Lectures, National Institute of Multimedia Education, 1999
- People Talk, National Institute of Multimedia Education, 1999
- TV-News, National Institute of Multimedia Education, 2000
- Movie Time 1, National Institute of Multimedia Education, 2000
- Movie Time 2, National Institute of Multimedia Education, 2000
- College Life, MEXT Research Grant-in Aid, 2001
- First Listening, MEXT Research Grant-in Aid, 2001
- Medical English 1, National Institute of Multimedia Education, 2001
- Introduction to College Life, MEXT Research Grant-in Aid, 2002
- College Life II, MEXT Research Grant-in Aid, 2003
- English for Science 1, National Institute of Multimedia Education, 2003
- English for Science 2, National Institute of Multimedia Education, 2003
- New York Live, Chiba University, 2004
- International Students, Chiba University, 2005
- American Daily Life, Chiba University, 2005
- People at Work, Chiba University, 2006
- Enjoy Listening, Funabashi City Board of Education, 2007
- Gateway to Australia, Chiba University, 2008
- You've Got M@il, Chiba University, 2009
- A Bit of Britain, Chiba University, 2009
- First Step Abroad, Chiba University, 2009
- Canadian Ways, Chiba University, 2010
- AFP News from the World, Chiba University, 2012
- World Health Issues, Chiba University, 2013
- English for Nursing Science, Chiba University, 2014

== Distance learning teaching material (supervising editor) ==
- Takefuta, Yukio, ed. (2002). ヒアリングマラソン中級コース [Hearing marathon intermediate course] (in Japanese). Vol. 1–6. ALC.
- Takefuta, Yukio, ed. (2004–2005). ヒアリングマラソン・ベーシックkikuzo！ [Kikuzo! Hearing marathon basic course] (in Japanese). Vol. 1–6. ALC.
