= Domenico Mennitti =

Italian journalist and politician

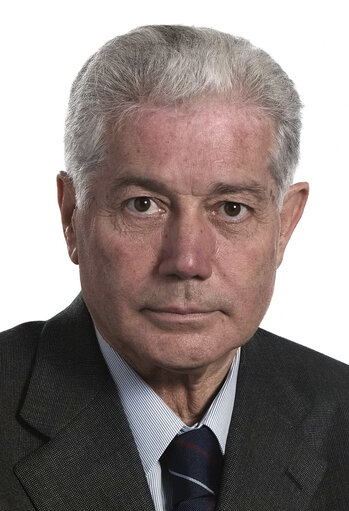
- Born: 11 August 1939; Termoli, Molise, Italy
- Died: 6 April 2014 (aged 74); Brindisi, Apulia, Italy
- Occupations: Journalist and politician
- Political party: Italian Social Movement

Domenico Mennitti (11 August 1939 – 6 April 2014) was an Italian journalist and politician from the Italian Social Movement. He served as Vice-Secretary of his party and as a member of the Chamber of Deputies during three legislatures (1979–1991) and was also a Member of the European Parliament (MEP) from 1999 to 2004.

After leaving the European Parliament, Mennitti served as Mayor (síndaco) of Brindisi from 13 June 2004 to 31 August 2011.
