= Carol Grimaldi =

American restaurateur

Carol Grimaldi (née Lancieri, May 20, 1938 – April 10, 2014) was an American restaurateur and co-founder of Grimaldi's Pizzeria.

In 1933, her uncle, Pasquale Lancieri, founded the Patsy's Pizzeria in Harlem, which was one of the first pizzerias in Harlem. The Harlem-born Grimaldi and her husband were forced to change the name from Patsy's to Grimaldi's in the mid-1990s, due to a dispute with another restaurant. Eight years after the opening of the pizzeria, Grimaldi and her husband sold the pizzeria, and retired from the restaurant business. While still remaining in different business enterprises throughout the years, including Juliana's Pizzeria, the couple decided to re-open the former pizzeria business in 2011.

Juliana's is located near the location of Grimaldi's, and serves modern-style pizzas.

The couple was interviewed about pizza-eating techniques on NPR in 2014. As of 2014, the Grimaldi brand has become global.

== Personal life ==
Carol Grimaldi died of cancer in 2014 in Queens, New York, aged 75. She had been battling cancer for more than a year at the time of her death. She was survived by her husband/business partner, Pasquale Grimaldi.
