= Mahay Choramo =

Mahay Choramo (1920s – April 13, 2014) was an Ethiopian evangelist who planted dozens of churches in remote areas in Ethiopia in the twentieth century.

== Background ==
The exact date (or even the exact year) and place of Mahay Choramo's birth is not known, beyond that he was born in the Southern Nations, Nationalities, and People's Region of Ethiopia in the mid-1920s. His mother, Paltore Posha, was from Humbo in Welayta. Choramo, her second husband and Mahay's father, was from Kucha.

Choramo named his son "Mahay Choramo." "Mahay" means "leopard" in the local language. However, like many non-Amharas in Ethiopia, Mahay Choramo often Amharized his name (e.g. in his autobiography), and went by the Amharan name of "Mahari", which means "merciful." Mahay Choramo had three siblings: a sister, Tera, who died when she was two years old, and two brothers, Meskele (d. 1976) and Feteshey (d. 1979).

Up to this point in time, the only Christians in Ethiopia were members of the Ethiopian Orthodox Tewahedo Church, which was the religion of the Amharas and the Tigray-Tigrinya. (The Ethiopian Orthodox Tewahedo Church conducted its liturgy in the otherwise extinct language of Ge'ez, though the church used Amharic in its administrative and social life.) Subjects of the Ethiopian Empire who were not Amharas or Tigray-Tigrinya followed various African traditional religions; to become a Christian a person had to abandon his or her local ethnic identity and embrace the dominant Tigray-Tigrinya-Amhara culture. Beginning in the 1920s, however, Emperor Haile Selassie allowed non-Orthodox missionaries into Ethiopia, on the condition that they would not translate their works into Amharic and would focus only on the non-Amharic-speaking population.

As such, the Sudan Interior Mission (SIM) launched its "New Churches Movement" in the late 1920s. In April 1928, expatriate missionaries from the SIM. arrived at Sodo and began a mission there, establishing a hospital and conducting evangelism in the surrounding rural areas. These missionaries left Sodo on April 17, 1937, in the wake of the Italian invasion of Ethiopia. They left behind them a small group of local Christian converts. The missionaries had translated a small amount of material into the local Wolaytta language, consisting mainly of a Scripture Gift Mission pamphlet entitled God Hath Spoken and the Gospel of John. Unfortunately for the converts, the whole Bible was available only in Amharic, a language which they associated with absentee landlords and greedy government officials.

== Conversion and life as an evangelist ==
Mahay Choramo heard itinerant evangelists preaching and underwent a religious conversion. (He had no contact with the SIM missionaries, only with their followers.) At a time when many people in Mahay Choramo's region believed that Satan was a literal person who was plotting against them and "Get away Satan" was a common expression, Mahay Choramo's conversion convinced him that he didn't need to be afraid of Satan, and he made it his personal goal to preach the Good News so that others needn't be afraid of Satan any more either. Desiring to read the Bible for himself, Mahay Choramo taught himself Amharic and obtained a copy of the Bible. He came to admire the evangelists of the New Testament and determined to follow their example. The Book of Acts also convinced him that persecution was the lot of a Christian, a message he took to heart since at this time non-Orthodox Christians in Ethiopia were subject to persecution. On one famous occasion in the early 1940s, when a judge sentenced Mahay Choramo to time in prison, Choramo thanked the judge. When the judge asked why he was thanking him, Mahay Choramo replied "I will be able to pray and meditate better on my own." Mahay Choramo's opposition to the Ethiopian authorities brought him into contact with other Ethiopian Christian dissidents.

Over the next fifty years, Mahay Choramo dedicated his life to church planting, planting dozens of new congregations throughout southern Ethiopia. He did not consider himself a church planter, however, since he believed that churches must be organized spontaneously from the ground up. Rather, he would move into a new area, initiate contact with locals, and live with them and preach to them until a church was formed. For example, in Gamu-Gofa, he set himself up as a merchant selling salt. In the market, he would pray for the sick and preach to anyone who would listen. After a while, he gained some converts, whom he encouraged to meet regularly to listen to him preach. Eventually, he helped these converts to select a pastor from among themselves, and Mahay Choramo then moved on to the next locality. Mahay Choramo believed that this method was faithful to the methods employed by the apostles in the Book of Acts. However, Mahay Choramo did maintain a lifelong relationship with the Wolaytta Kale Heywet Church, to which he would periodically return between missions.

== Theology ==
Mahay Choramo's theology was unique to himself, constructed on the basis of his initial contact with SIM converts, his personal reading of the Bible, and, to a degree, his exposure to Ethiopian Orthodox Christianity.

The major themes of Mahay Choramo's preaching were the love of God and the empowering of the Holy Spirit.

== Dark years ==
The Derg, which overthrew Haile Selassie in 1974, was hostile to Christianity. Between 1985 and 1990, all of the churches founded by Mahay in Welayta were forced to close, with even preaching at funerals banned. Mahay Choramo encouraged his followers to band together in small groups and to take risks in order to continue their worship and resist the Derg repression.

After the Ethiopian People's Revolutionary Democratic Front took over in 1991, Mahay Choramo was able to move about more freely, but he still faced periodic persecution, and was arrested at one point.

== Recent activities ==
Since 1998, Mahay Choramo had been working with local and expatriate missionaries, and foreigners (notably Malcolm Hunter) in conducting missions in the Borena Zone to the Borana people until his death on April 13, 2014.
