= Adhik Shirodkar =

Adhik Shirodkar was an Indian lawyer and politician. A prominent criminal lawyer from Mumbai, Shirodkar represented the Shiv Sena party in the Srikrishna Commission. He was a member of the Rajya Sabha (upper house of the Parliament of India). Shirodkar died on 19 April 2014.
