= Dennis Liwewe =

Zambian football commentator

Philip Dennis Liwewe (10 January 1936 – 22 April 2014) better known as Dennis Liwewe, was a football (soccer) commentator who travelled the sports world 96 times spanning more than 40 countries. He was born on the shore of Lake Malawi on January 10, 1936, and moved to Zambia in 1960 where he worked as a journalist for the Nchanga Weekly Newspaper. In 1973, he began working for Zambia Consolidated Copper Mines where he worked as the Director of Media and the Public Relations until he retired in 1986. Following his retirement, Dennis Liwewe became a motivational speaker to retirees and would set the tone of the speeches by delivering a keynote address that drew heavily on his love for football and for reading. He died on the 22 April 2014, following a battle with liver complications. The Zambian government declared three days national mourning and gave him a State Funeral in honor of his contribution to Zambia.
