= Ian Askew =

British Army officer (born 1921)

Captain Ian Voase Askew MC (9 May 1921 – 14 April 2014) was a former officer in the British Army, winner of the Military Cross, High Sheriff of Sussex, huntsman with the Southdown Hunt and philanthropist.
