= Sarmad Tariq =

Pakistani storyteller and motivational speaker

Sarmad Tariq سرمد طارق
- Born: 17 December 1975; Islamabad, Pakistan
- Died: 30 April 2014 (aged 38)
- Occupations: Life coach, motivational speaker, writer
- Years active: 2005–2014
- Spouse: Zehra Kamal
- Website: Facebook page

Sarmad Tariq (17 December 1975 – 30 April 2014), also known as "the chairman", was a storyteller and motivational speaker from Islamabad, Pakistan. After meeting a swimming accident at the age of 15, he was paralyzed from the left shoulder down and began using a wheelchair (hence his nickname). He also holds the world record of longest non-stop drive by a quadriplegic by driving his hand controlled car for 33 hours, covering a distance of 1,847 km from Khyber to Karachi.

On 30 January 2005, he was the first wheelchair-using athlete to participate in the Lahore Marathon. By completing the race in seven and a half hours, he qualified to represent his country in ING New York City Marathon 2005 and made history for Pakistan by returning with a finisher's medal.

Among his other accomplishments, he learned to drive a specially adapted automatic car, and obtained a job with a software firm by the age of 23. Soon afterward, he married Zehra, his childhood neighbor from the southwestern city of Quetta.

On 30 April 2014, Tariq died at the age of 38.
