= Jerzy Wieteski =

Polish footballer

Personal information
- Date of birth: 16 October 1934
- Place of birth: Rawa Mazowiecka, Poland
- Date of death: 24 April 2014 (aged 79)
- Place of death: Łódź, Poland
- Height: 1.73 m (5 ft 8 in)
- Position: Forward

Youth career
- ŁKS Łódź

Senior career*
Years	Team	Apps	(Gls)
1952–1965	ŁKS Łódź		
- * Club domestic league appearances and goals

Jerzy Wieteski (16 October 1934 – 24 April 2014) was a Polish footballer who played as a forward.

He was a youth product of ŁKS Łódź, where he played from 1952 to 1965. In 1957 he won Polish Cup and year later he was crowned a Polish Champion.

== Honours ==
ŁKS Łódź

- Ekstraklasa: 1958
- Polish Cup: 1956–57
