= Melissa Minnich Coleman =

American architect

- Born: Mary Melissa Minnich; October 9, 1917; Landisville, Pennsylvania
- Died: April 1, 2014 (aged 96)
- Known for: Architecture
- Spouse: Clifford LeRoy Colem (m. 1942–1983)
- Awards: Beaux-Arts Institute of Design (BAID) (1938)

Melissa Minnich Coleman (October 9, 1917 – April 1, 2014), (born Mary Melissa Minnich) was an architect specializing in school buildings. She was born in Landisville, Pennsylvania. She graduated from Pennsylvania State University in 1939 with a bachelor's degree in architectural engineering, after being awarded the 1938 Beaux-Arts Institute of Design (BAID) medal. She worked in Wilmington, Delaware from 1939 until 1941 for architect John F. Mullins, and met her husband Clifford LeRoy Coleman there. They were married August 29, 1942.

== Coleman & Coleman ==
Coleman and her husband established the firm of Coleman & Coleman in Landisville in 1947, merging with Haak & Kaufman of Myerstown, Pennsylvania in 1970 to form Haak, Kaufman, Coleman & Coleman.

External videos
- The Milton Hershey School, WITF, 3:53. Includes shots of the Milton Hershey School building

Coleman & Coleman first specialized on designing schools in Lancaster County, such as Hempfield High School, Penn Manor High School, and Centerville Middle School. They designed forty-eight student houses for the Milton Hershey School, along with a school building, Catherine Hall, Founder's Hall and the Hershey Motor Lodge.

Coleman also worked for Hercules Powder Company, A. T. Granger Associates, and the Buchart Engineering Company. She served as a vice president of the American Association of University Women in 1952–1953.
