= Arthur Woodhouse =

English cricketer

Personal information
- Full name: Arthur James Powys Woodhouse
- Born: 20 October 1933; Sidcup, Kent, England
- Died: 19 April 2014 (aged 80); Ashford, Kent, England
- Batting: Right-handed
- Bowling: Right-arm medium

Career statistics
Competition	First-class
Matches	1
Runs scored	29
Batting average	14.50
100s/50s	–/–
Top score	17
Balls bowled	18
Wickets	1
Bowling average	20.00
5 wickets in innings	–
10 wickets in match	–
Best bowling	1/20
Catches/stumpings	–/–
- Source: Cricinfo, 6 April 2012

Arthur James Powys Woodhouse known as Jim (20 October 1933 – 19 April 2014) was an English cricketer. Woodhouse was a right-handed batsman who bowled right-arm medium. He was born at Sidcup, Kent.

Educated at Oundle School, Woodhouse later made a single first-class appearance for the Free Foresters against Oxford University at the University Parks in 1957. Oxford University won the toss and elected to bat first, making 347/6 declared, during which Woodhouse bowled three overs and took the wicket of Richard Jowett. In the Free Foresters first-innings response of 146 all out, he scored 12 runs before being dismissed by Jowett, while in their second-innings the same bowler dismissed him for 17. Oxford University won the match by 187 runs.

He later became a company director.
