= Ernest Kurnow =

Ernest Kurnow (October 21, 1912 – April 7, 2014) was a professor at New York University.

== Early life ==
Kurnow was born in 1912 in Brooklyn, New York and attended The City College of New York and New York University. He was featured in a 2009 The New York Times interview on his experience growing up during the Great Depression.

== Career ==
Kurnow was professor of undergraduate business statistics at the Leonard N. Stern School of Business where he was teaching since 1948. In his tenure at NYU, he served as director of the Doctoral Program and was the chairman of the Department of Statistics and Operations Research from 1962 to 1976. Apart from his teaching activities, Kurnow was consultant to government organizations, private corporations, and public utilities in the areas of finance, survey design, and forecasting. He died at the age of 101 on April 7, 2014.

== Education ==
- Ph.D., New York University, 1951
- M.S., City College of New York, 1933
- B.S., City College of New York, 1932

== Awards ==
- NYU Alumni Great Teacher Award in 1974
- Fellow of the American Statistical Association
- Elected to the International Statistical Institute
