= Don Earl =

Australian rules footballer

Personal information
- Full name: Don Bradman Earl
- Born: 4 January 1933
- Died: 29 April 2014 (aged 81)
- Height: 178 cm (5 ft 10 in)
- Weight: 81 kg (179 lb)

Playing career^{1}
| Years | Club | Games (Goals) |
| 1952–55 | South Melbourne | 15 (0) |
- ^{1} Playing statistics correct to the end of 1955.

Don Bradman Earl (4 January 1933 – 29 April 2014) was an Australian rules footballer who played with South Melbourne in the Victorian Football League (VFL).
