= Madan Pande =

Indian cricketer (1943–2014)

Personal information
- Born: 25 December 1943; Nagpur, India
- Died: 28 April 2014 (aged 70); Talegaon, India
- Source: ESPNcricinfo, 22 April 2016

Madan Pande (25 December 1943 – 28 April 2014) was an Indian cricketer.

== Career ==
He played four first-class matches for Vidarbha between 1960 and 1962.
