= Minoru Sano (chef) =

Japanese celebrity chef

Minoru Sano (佐野 実, Sano Minoru; April 4, 1951 – April 11, 2014) was a Japanese celebrity chef who specialized in ramen. He was called the Oni of Ramen in Japan. He founded the Shinasobaya Company and helped run the Shin-Yokohama Ramen Museum.

Minoru Sano was born in Totsuka-ku in the city of Yokohama in Kanagawa Prefecture, Japan. He had numerous appearances in the Japanese media. He had many ramen chef disciples. He died of multiple organ failure after suffering with Diabetes for 3 years prior to his death in hospital, surrounded by family.
