= Robert Potter (geographer) =

British geographer (1950–2014)

Robert B. Potter (24 February 1950 – 12 April 2014) was a British academic geographer, focussing on urbanisation and development issues in the Caribbean. He was Emeritus Professor at the University of Reading, UK.

== Background ==
Potter was trained in geography at the University of London in the 1970s (BSc first class, Bedford College 1971; PhD on urban retailing 1974/5). From 1974 he rose through the ranks at Royal Holloway, University of London (initially working at Bedford College, later merged), becoming Professor of Geography and then Head of Department (1994-1999). He joined the Department of Geography at the University of Reading in 2003, and later became Head of its School of Human and Environmental Sciences (2008-2012). He battled cancer from 2009, and retired in 2013.

== Contributions ==
Potter was a leader in the study of urbanisation trends in developing countries, notably in the Caribbean. He worked on urbanisation, housing and planning, tourism, gender, returning migrants and human aspects of environmental hazards. A later focus was second-generation transnational migration to the Caribbean (Barbados, St Lucia, Trinidad and Tobago).

Latterly he obtained a Leverhulme Trust Programme Grant, Water, Life and Civilisation, based on the Middle East and North Africa (MENA), writing books and articles on water management in Jordan.

He was a consultant to the Government of Barbados and the Inter-American Development Bank for the Third National Physical Development Plan for Barbados.

He produced several textbooks on geographies of development and development studies, and founded the journal Progress in Development Studies. A prolific writer he authored 30 books and 250 articles.

== Awards ==
- Academician of the Academy of Social Sciences
- Awarded a DSc, University of Reading, UK
- Fellowship, Institute for Advanced Study, Indiana University (2006)

== Publications ==
- Desai, V. and Potter, R.B. (eds.) 2014. The Companion to Development Studies. 3rd edition. Routledge, London and New York.
- Potter, R.B., Conway, D., Evans, R. and Lloyd-Evans, S. 2012. Key concepts in development geography. Sage Publications, London.
- Potter, R.B. 2010. Urbanisation and planning in the Third World: spatial perceptions and public participation. Routledge, London, UK,
- Conway, D. and Potter, R.B. (eds.) 2009. Return Migration of the Next Generations: 21st Century Transnational Mobility. Ashgate, Farnham UK and Burlington USA.
- Potter, R.B., Binns, T., Elliott, J.A. and Smith, D. 2008. Geographies of Development: an Introduction to Development Studies. Pearson-Prentice Hall, Harlow, London, New York.
- Potter, R.B., Lloyd, M. and Jacyno, J. 2007. A Social Atlas of Barbados: a cartographic and statistical analysis. Arawak Publications, Kingston, Jamaica.
- Potter, R.B. and Phillips, J. 2006. Citizens by Descent: Bajan-Brit Young Return Migrants. Ashgate, Aldershot and Burlington, USA.
- Desai, V. and Potter, R.B. 2006. Doing Development Research. Sage Publications, London, Thousand Oaks and New Delhi.
- Colantonio, A. and Potter, R.B. 2006. Urban Tourism and Development in the Socialist State: Havana during the 'Special Period'. Ashgate Publishing Company, Aldershot UK and Burlington USA.
- Potter, R.B. Conway, D. and Phillips, J. 2005. The Experience of Return Migration: Caribbean Perspectives. Ashgate Publishing, Aldershot and Brookfield, USA.
- Potter, R.B., Barker, D., Conway, D. and Klak, T. 2004. The Contemporary Caribbean. Pearson/Prentice-Hall, London and New York.
- Pugh, J. and Potter, R.B. (eds.) 2003. Participatory planning in the Caribbean: lessons from practice. Ashgate, Aldershot.
- Lloyd-Evans, S. and Potter, R.B. 2002. Gender, ethnicity and the informal sector in Trinidad. Ashgate, Aldershot.
- Potter, R.B., Lloyd, M. and Jacyno, J. 2003. A Social Atlas of Barbados: Cartographic and Statistical Analysis Arawak Publications: Kingston Jamaica.
- Watson, M. and Potter, R.B. 2001. Low-Cost Housing in Barbados: Evolution or Social Revolution? University of the West Indies Press: Barbados, Jamaica, Trinidad and Tobago.\
- Potter, R.B. 2000. The Urban Caribbean in an Era of Global Change. Ashgate: Aldershot.
- Potter, R.B. and Lloyd-Evans, S. 1998. The City in the Developing World. Prentice-Hall: London and New York.
- Potter, R.B. and D. Conway (eds.) 1997. Self-Help Housing, the Poor, and the State in the Caribbean . University of Tennessee Press.
- Potter, R.B. 1992. St. Vincent and the Grenadines (World Bibliographical Series). ABC Clio.
- Potter, R.B. 1995. Low Income Housing And The State In The Eastern Caribbean. University of West Indies Press.
- Potter, R.B. and A.T. Salau. 1990. Cities and Development in the Third World. Mansell.
- Potter, R.B and T. Unwin. (eds.) 1989. The Geography of Urban-Rural Interaction in Developing Countries. Routledge.
- Potter, R.B. & G. Dann. 1987. Barbados (World Bibliographical Series). ABC Clio.
- Potter, R.B. 1982. Urban Retailing System: Location, Cognition and Behaviour. Gower.
