= Theoklitos Setakis =

- Metropolitan of Ioannina
- Native name: Θεόκλητος Σετάκης
- Church: Greek Orthodox Church
- Diocese: Ioannina
- In office: 1975

Orders
- Ordination: 1960
- Consecration: 1975

Personal details
- Born: December 7, 1930
- Died: April 13, 2014 (aged 83)

Theoklitos Setakis (Greek: Θεόκλητος Σετάκης; 7 December 1930 – 13 April 2014) was a Greek Orthodox bishop.

Born in 1930, Setaklis was ordained a priest in 1960. In 1975, he was named metropolitan of Ioannina. He was involved with finances of the Greek Orthodox Church and was on the board of directors of the National Bank of Greece. On 9 April 2013, he resigned from the board of directors of the National Bank of Greece. He died on 13 April 2014.
