= L. B. McGinnis =

American novelist

Larry Bruce McGinnis (April 7, 1941 - April 5, 2014, Amarillo, TX), also known as L. B. McGinnis and Bruce McGinnis, was an American writer, poet, and college professor. He was a professor of English at Amarillo College for 37 years.

McGinnis was the author of four novels: The Fence (1979, ISBN 978-0814908211), Sweet Cane (1981, ISBN 978-0814908570), Reflections in Dark Glass: The Life and Times of John Wesley Hardin (1996, ISBN 978-1574410082), and Dog Dreams (2007); and a non-fiction book about a saddle maker, Schweitzer.

McGinnis received the Amarillo College John F. Mead Faculty Excellence Award in 2000–2001.
