= Kyriakou =

Kyriakou (Greek: Κυριάκου or Κυριακού), sometimes transliterated as Kiriakou or Kyriacou, is a Greek or – more commonly –; a Greek-Cypriot surname. Notable people with the surname include:

- Andi Kyriacou (born 1983), Irish rugby player
- Anna Kyriakou (1929–2025), Greek actress
- Charalambos Kyriakou (born 1989), Cypriot association football player
- Charalampos Kyriakou (born 1995), Cypriot association football player
- Demetris Kyriakou (born 1986), Cypriot association football player
- Emanuel Kiriakou (born 1966), American songwriter and producer
- John Kiriakou (born 1964), American CIA analyst
- Kyriacos Kyriacou (born 1989), Cypriot association football player
- Maria Elena Kiriakou (born 1984), Cypriot singer
- Michalis Kyriakou (born 1944), known professionally as Mihalis Violaris, Cypriot singer
- Minos Kyriakou (1942–2017), Greek shipping magnate
- Rena Kyriakou (1917–1994), Greek pianist
- Vangelis Kyriakou (born 1994), Cypriot footballer
- Xenios Kyriacou (born 1979), Cypriot association footballer

== See also ==
- Kyriakos
- Kyriacos
