= Benny Kuriakose =

Indian architect (born 1962)

Dr. Benny Kuriakose
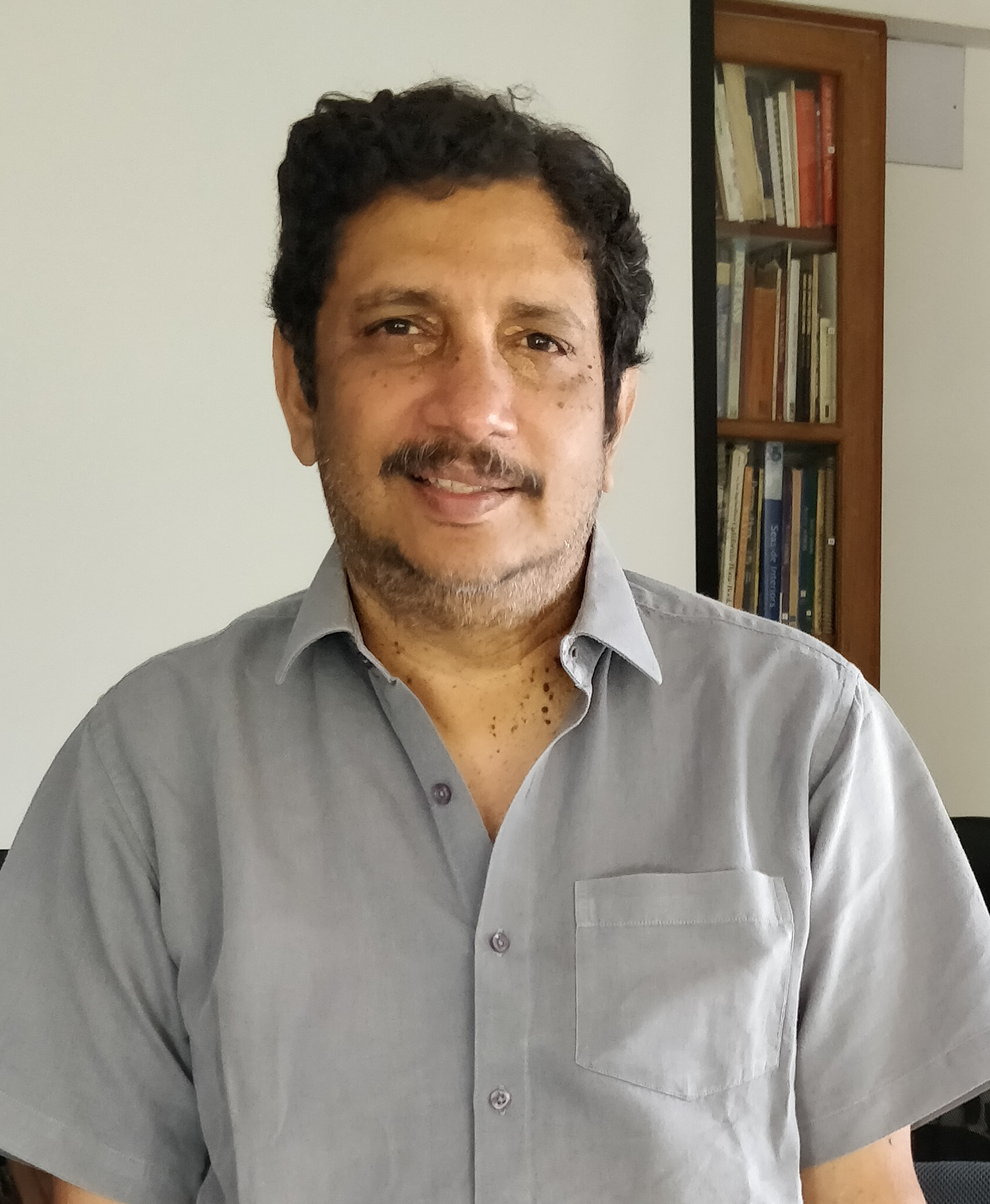
- Dr. Benny Kuriakose
- Born: 25 May 1962; Kerala, India
- Occupation: Designer
- Projects: Muziris Heritage Project, Alleppey Heritage Project, DakshinaChitra
- Website: bennykuriakose.com

Benny Kuriakose (born 25 May 1962) was born in Kerala, India. He made his mark in architectural conservation and the design of new buildings, taking his roots from the vernacular architecture of South India. He is known for designing structures which are built from natural materials such as timber, stone and brick. He has practiced mostly in Chennai and Kerala. He runs a consultancy firm in Chennai.

== Early life and education ==
Kuriakose was born in Koothattukulam and brought up in Thiruvananthapuram. There he attended the Government Model High School before joining the Government Arts College for his Pre-Degree course. He then attended the College of Engineering, Trivandrum, where he took a basic degree in Civil Engineering. In 1986, he received the Charles Wallace India Trust Award for a master's degree in Conservation Studies from the Institute of Advanced Architectural Studies at the University of York, in the UK. He completed a doctoral degree at the Department of Humanities and Social Sciences, Indian Institute of Technology, Madras in 2015.

== Career ==
In 1984, as a recent graduate of the College of Engineering, Trivandrum, he started practicing architecture after a chance meeting with British-born, Indian architect Laurie Baker. After working with him for nine months, he started his own practice in 1985. During his early career as a self-taught architect, he worked with several organizations such as the Integrated Rural Technology Centre, Palakkad, the Centre of Science and Technology for Rural Development (COSTFORD) and Kerala State Nirmithi Kendra for the development of alternative, low-cost and eco-friendly architecture. From 1985 onwards, he built low-cost houses that mirrored Baker's style, until in 1992 he built the house of actor Mammootty.

In 1994, Kuriakose was commissioned by Malayala Manorama to design housing for the village of Banegaon after the 1993 Latur earthquake. He also designed the layout of public and residential buildings in the village of Chapredi for the Earth Quake Rehabilitation Project, Bhuj District, Gujarat State, 2002.

He has been visiting faculty at the School of Planning and Architecture, New Delhi, the Indian Institutes of Technology, the Indian Institutes of Management and other architecture schools.

Kuriakose was awarded the Inside Outside Designer of the Year 2001 for the weekend retreat in Chennai, and in 2011, the Celebration of Architecture Award from Inside Outside magazine. In 2016, he was conferred with the 2016 Estrade Lifetime Achievement Award (the previous recipient of this honor, in 1980, was Architect Karan Grover). He was also listed as one of the top 10 Indian architects who is harnessing traditional wisdom to build homes of the future.

He has written books such as Conserving of Timber Structures in India and Post Tsunami Reconstruction: Manual for Supervisors and Project Staff. He is one of the editors of the book Guidelines for the Preparation of a Heritage Management Plan published by INTACH.

Kuriakose has offered his services as a consultant to UNDP, UNESCO, various State Governments and other organizations. He has also presented many papers on Housing, Conservation and Cost–Effective Building Techniques in various seminars, conferences and workshops in India and abroad.

== Architectural Style ==
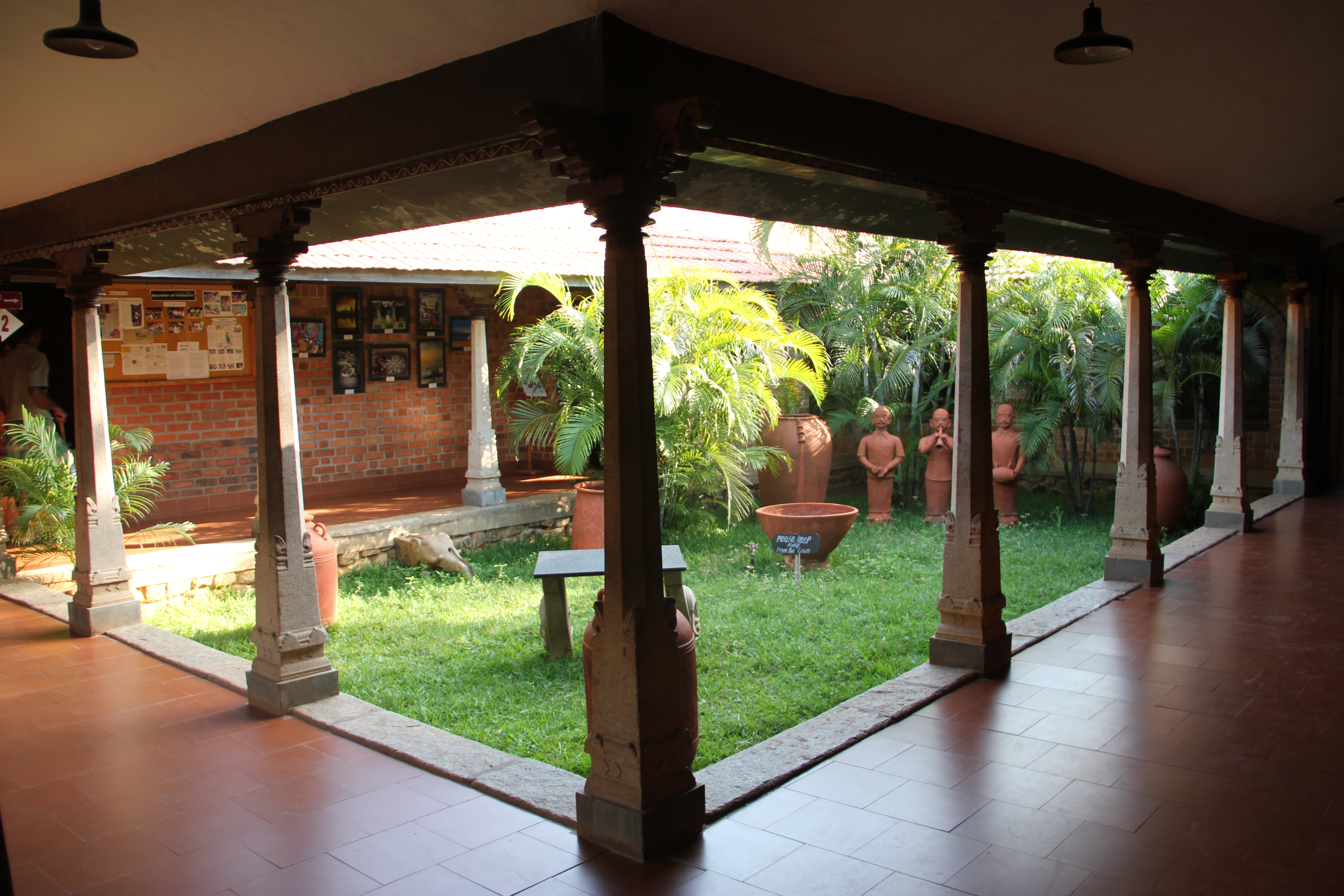
Dakshinachitra Model House

Kuriakose seeks to achieve sustainable architecture through vernacular and traditional practices. He believes in the logic behind vernacular architecture being climate responsive, and using locally available materials to create projects that have a simplistic beauty. Sustainability and cost-effectiveness form the most important factors in arriving at the final design.

He tries to explore an architecture that is appropriate to the environment, cost-effective, sustainable and at the same incorporates the principles of vernacular architecture in the modern context. Tradition and heritage is not used as a style, but more as a concept. Vernacular architecture to him is more like a depository of knowledge. Society ad technology has undergone many changes, so it is for architects to look at these and then derive a different kind of vocabulary in architecture. Kuriakose tries to design for the client in such a way that there is constant dialogue between them, each affecting the other in various ways, leading to and influencing the final design of the building. This leads the design to progress and clarify as it is continually revised in the light of the constant and evolving interpretations of the parameters. This leads to a final design that is unique and caters to the user.

Kuriakose does not have a style of his own. He thinks the concept is much more important than the style in design. He does not want to impose his ideas onto the buildings he designs. He designs each building according to each one's needs. All his projects look different because each homeowner has preferences and he tries to respond to their aspirations. The location is different, the climate is different, the materials are different and the clients are also different. He thinks that style is very superficial.

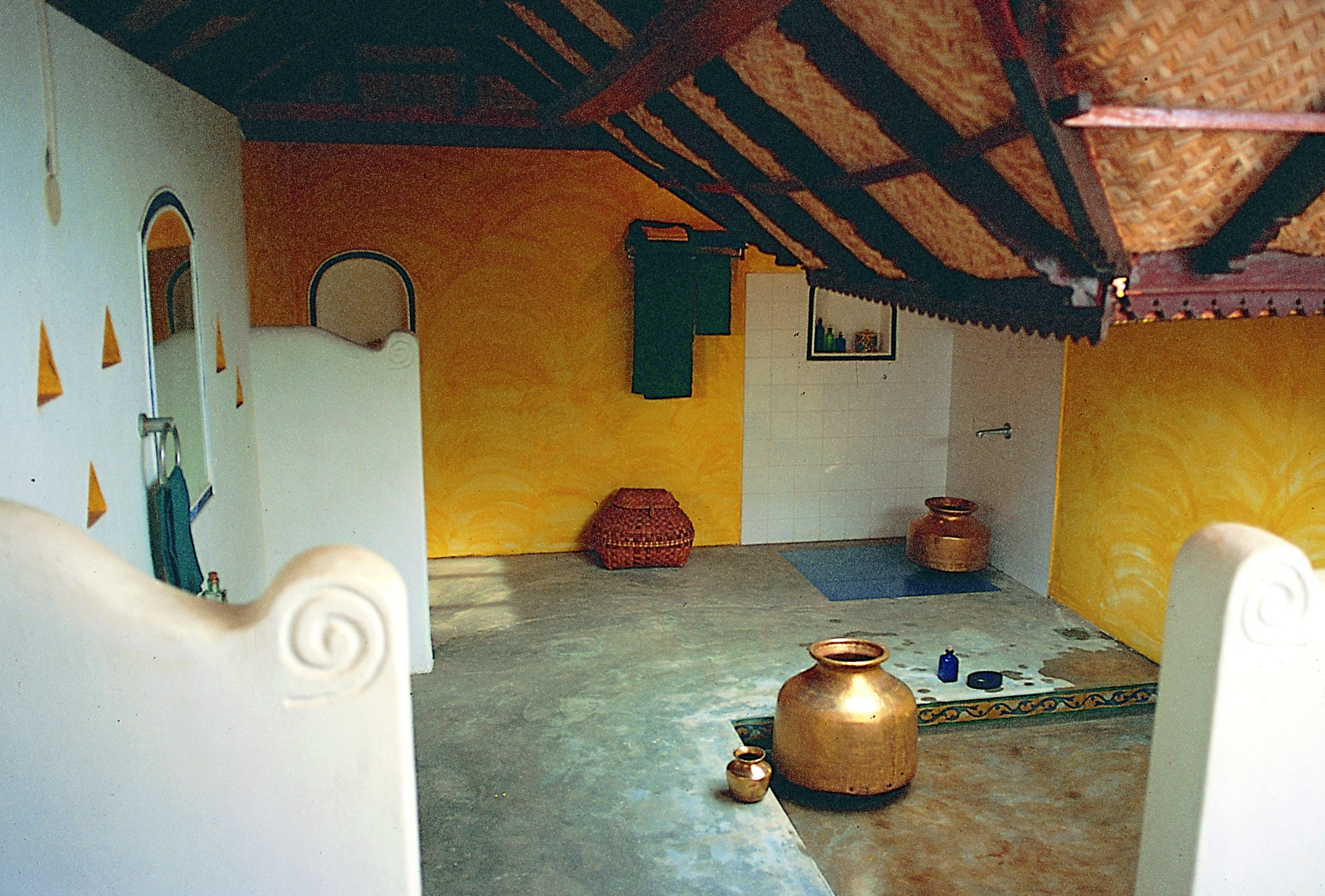
Vishram on The Sea

The sustainability aspects of his buildings varies. Although modern materials such as cement and steel are used, their use is limited and it is mostly natural materials that are prominent in his buildings. The answers to what makes a sustainable building vary, depending on physical factors such as climate, land availability, local building materials and social and cultural factors.

Courtyards, verandahs, and roofs are some of the elements Kuriakose uses in the design of buildings. Kerala, where he grew up, and Tamil Nadu where he has spent the last 25 years of his life have influenced him.

According to Kuriakose, the biggest challenge in the building industry today is to ensure the quality of construction. Everybody is interested in quantity and if the quality of construction cannot be ensured, the buildings will not last for long.

== Projects ==
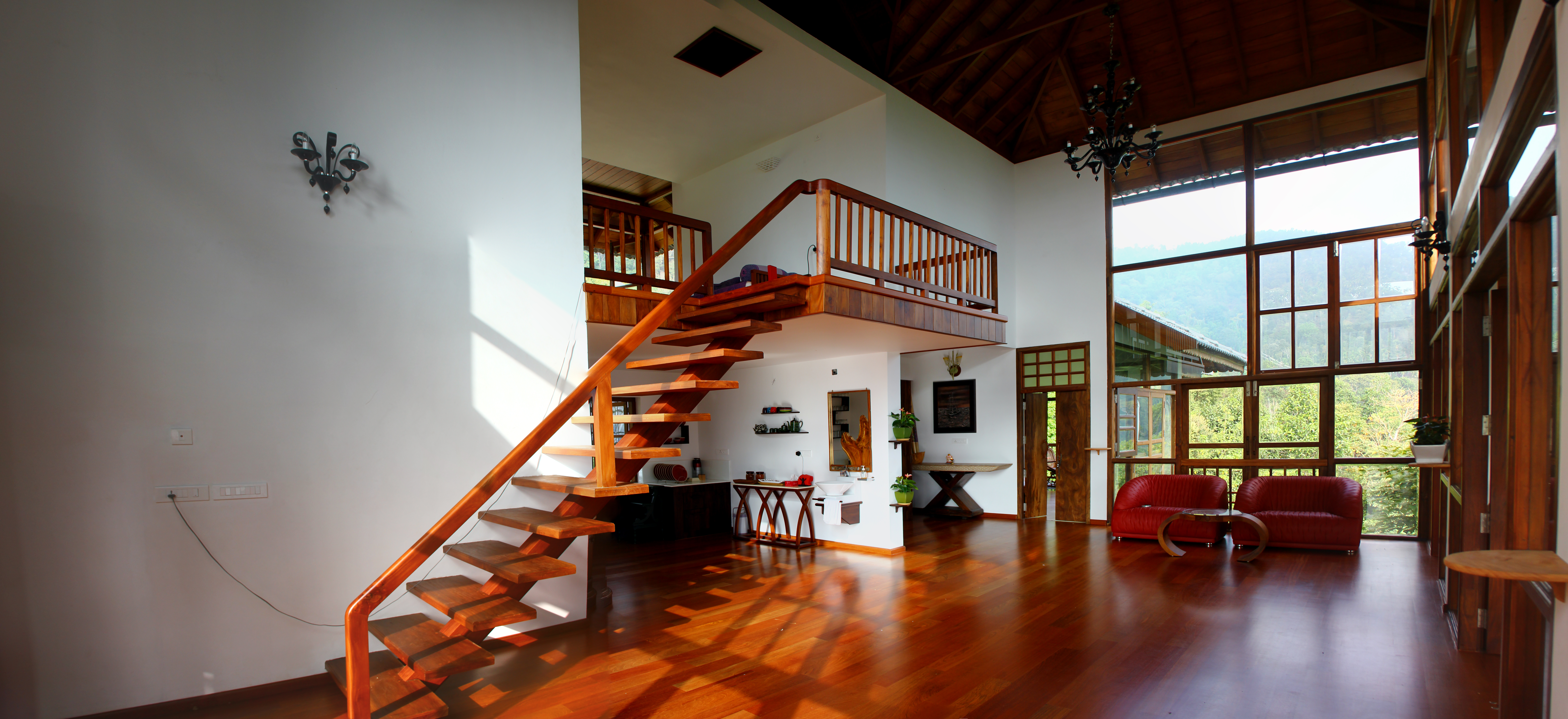
Wayanad House

- 1992 – Mammootty’s House
- 1994 – Rehabilitation Project for the Earthquake victims of Banegaon village, Latur
- 1995 onwards - Designed the Kerala Section and the Public Buildings for Dakshinachitra, heritage and crafts village
- 1999 – Institute of Palliative Medicine (Kozhikode)
- 2001 – Vishram on the Sea House
- 2002 – Rehabilitation Project for the Earthquake victims of Chapredi village, Bhuj
- 2003 – Backwater Ripples Resort, Kumarakom

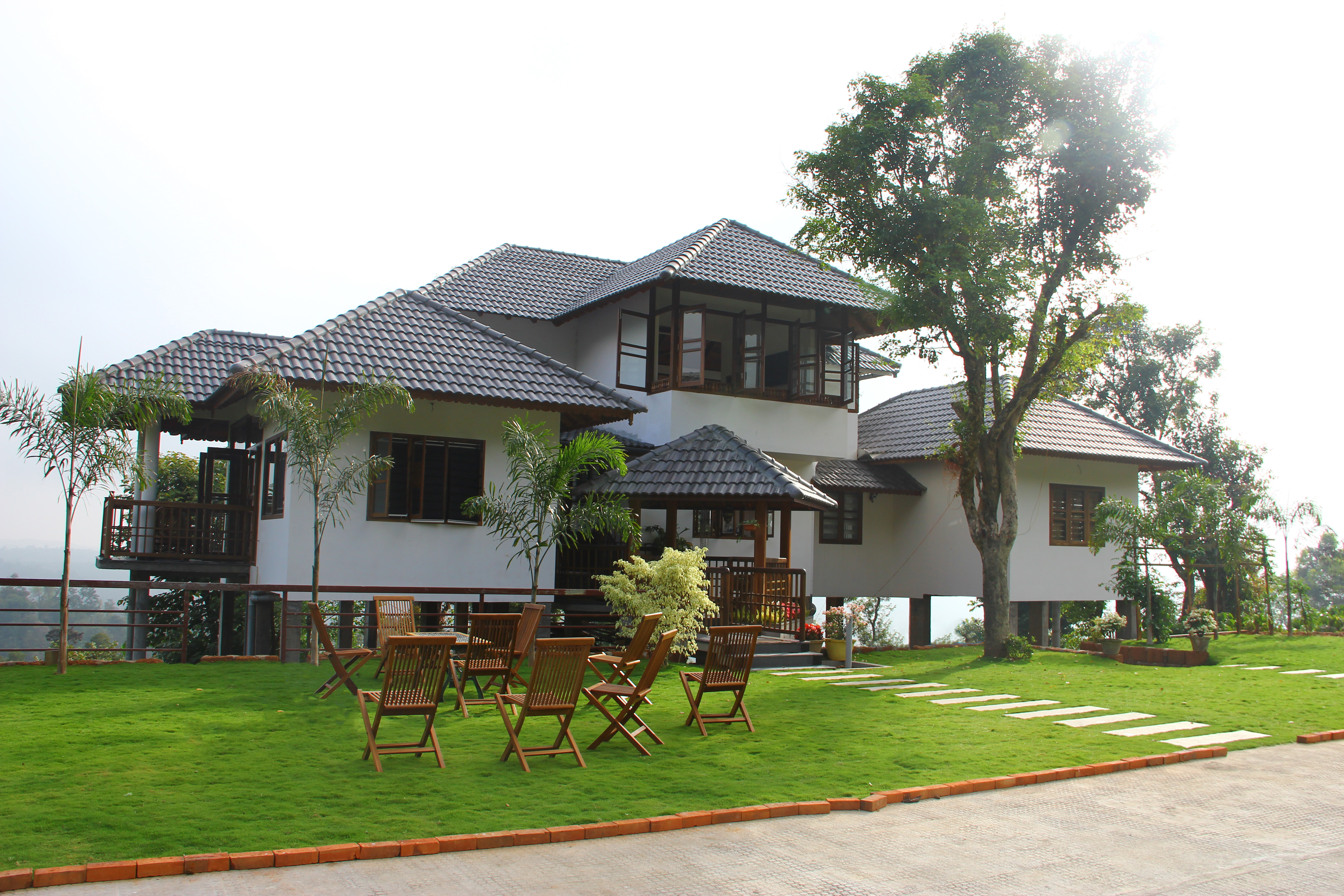
Wayanad House

- 2005 – Harishree Vidyalayam, Chennai
- 2006 – Reconstruction of the Tsunami affected villages of Tharangambadi and Chinnangudi
- 2008 onwards – Muziris Heritage Project
- 2009 – Derby Green Resort, Ooty
- 2010 – Casa Rojo House
- 2010 – Mangala Heritage
- 2011 – Sivaram House

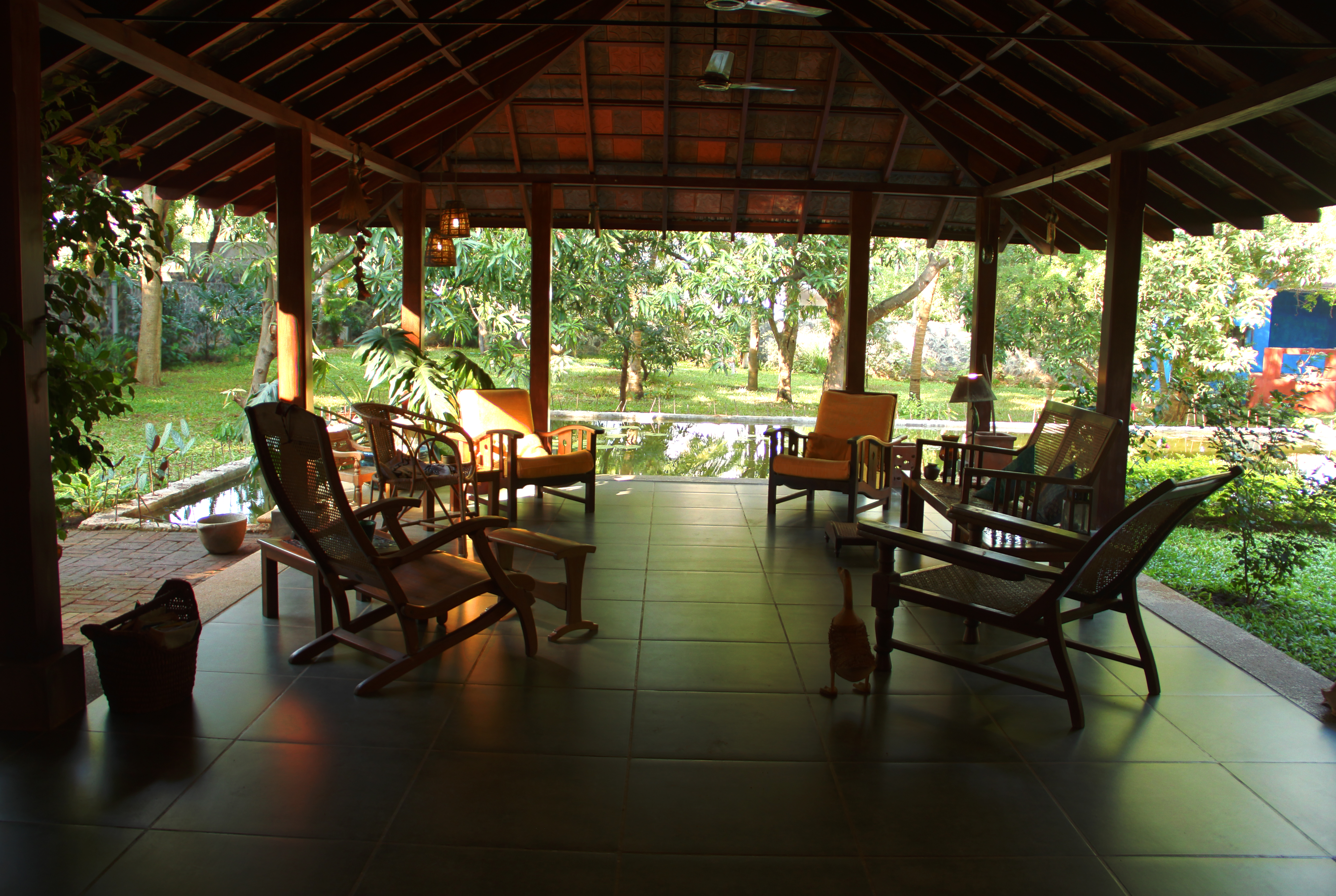
Casa Rojo

- 2011 – Paramankheni House
- 2011 – Wayanad House
- 2012 – Anantya Resorts , Kanyakumari District
- 2012 – Springdale Heritage Resort, Vandiperiyar
- 2014 – The Quiet by the River Resort, Kodanad

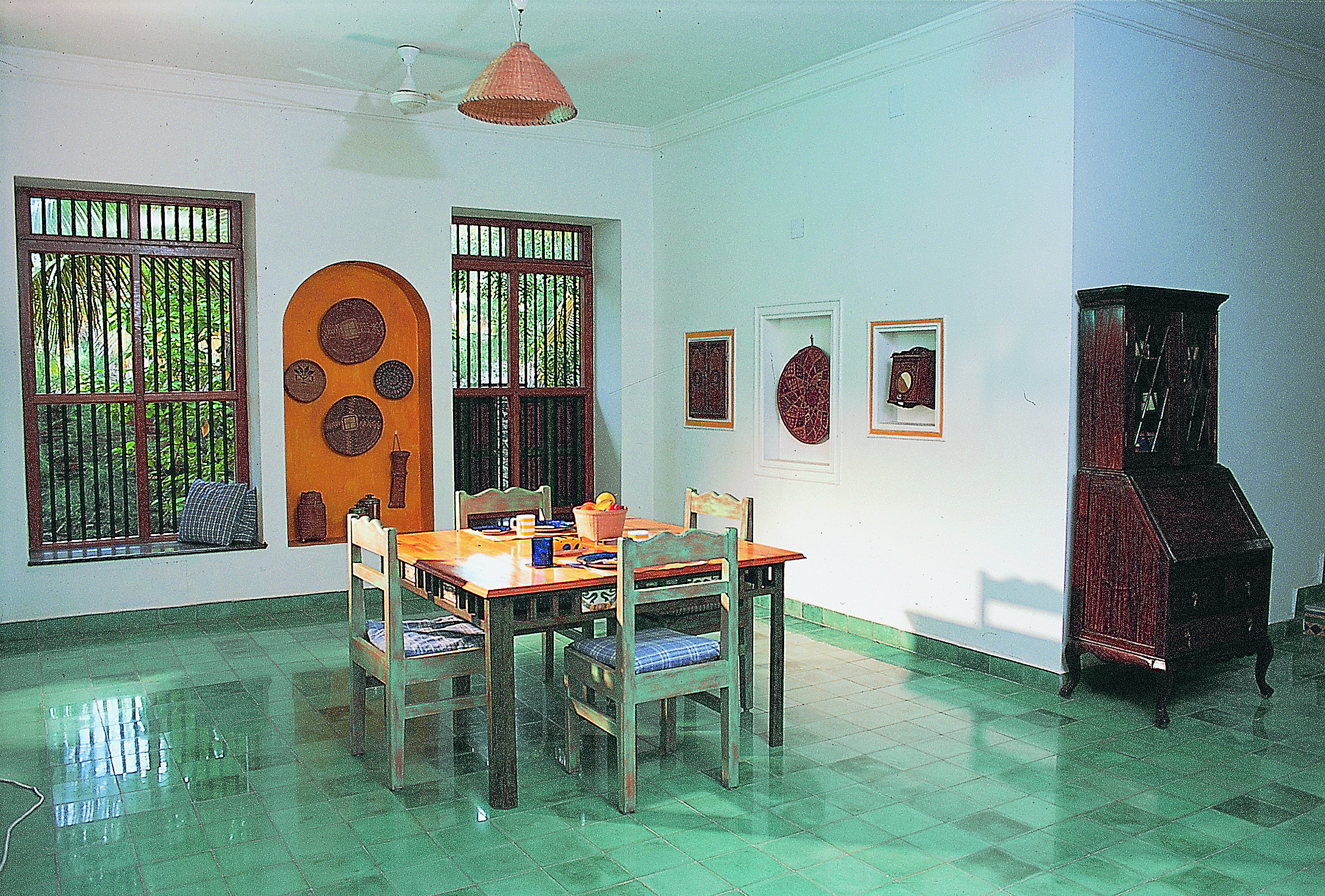
Vishram On The Sea - Dining

== Dakshinachitra craft village ==
Since 1995, Kuriakose has been involved in continuing and developing the design of DakshinaChitra Craft Village near Chennai based on the original site plan and sketches by Laurie Baker. Baker's sketches were translated into plans by him. In 1996, he moved to Chennai where he was commissioned to do the Kerala Section and the Public Buildings in DakshinaChitra.

== Tharangambadi and Chinnangudi tsunami rehabilitation project ==
Kuriakose went on to design more than 1,000 individualized homes for fisherfolk in Tharangambadi and Chinnangudi villages in Nagapattinam, under the Tsunami Rehabilitation Project. The basic ideology of the project was to provide houses for the victims of the 2004 tsunami, which hit the east coast of India. Generally, in public housing programs in India and elsewhere, a single type design is used for the construction of all of the houses.

In the case of the tsunami reconstruction project carried out by the NGO South Indian Federation of Fishermen Societies (SIFFS), a novel idea of involving the house owner in the design and construction of the house was tried out. Plots were allotted before the construction of the houses so that each house owner knew which house they would get.

In the design of the houses and the settlement of Tharangambadi and Chinnankudi affected by the tsunami, it was decided to make sure that the community and home owners participated in the rebuilding. Different models were offered and model homes were built so that people could understand what they were actually going to get. The sites were allocated to individuals before starting the construction itself. The houses were highly customized and the home owners had control over the construction process.

== Muziris heritage project ==
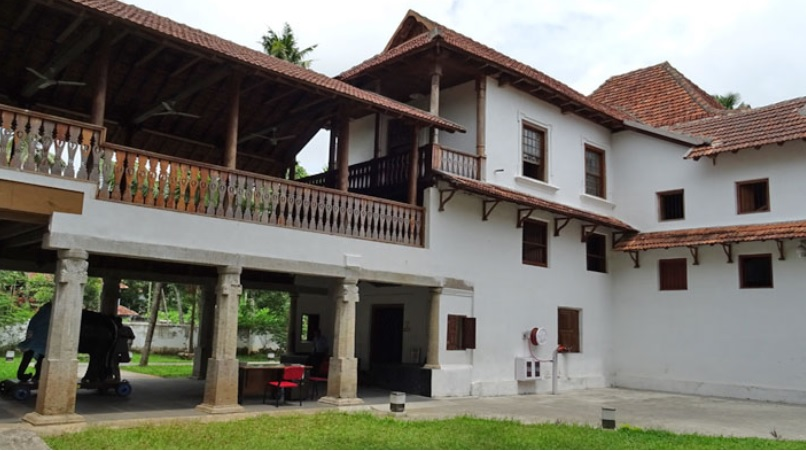
Paliam Palace Museum

Kuriakose was selected as conservation consultant for the Muziris Heritage Project in 2007. Muziris is not just a place. It is a concept and the project was an attempt to educate future generations about heritage, and to throw light on Kerala’s pan-Indian and international trade links. The project's artifacts and monuments are spread out over an area of 150 km^{2}, and Kuriakose's team has located clusters, including 400 buildings of historic importance and architectural interest.

It is an alternate approach to heritage management, and the biggest challenge was to develop a concept which suits the local context. The Muziris Heritage Project has many dimensions. It is an educational project, a developmental project and a model for sustainable tourism. The project was the brainchild of Dr. Thomas Isaac, who had grown up in the area. An economics professor from the Centre for Development Studies, he became the finance minister of Kerala in 2006. He envisioned Muziris as a non-formal education project for future generations.

The project involved the conservation of Paliam Palace, Paravur Synagogue, Kottappuram Fort, Kottappuram Market and many other historic structures in the Muziris area It has set a precedent in India for adopting an integrated approach to heritage conservation and regional development. The project also envisages features such as interactive museums, visitor centres, a virtual reconstruction centre, facilities to travel by boat on the River Periyar to various monuments, cycle tours of the area and circuit tours, to name a few. Floated in 2008, it is India's largest conservation project, spread over 25 sites, and links Kerala's histories of Dutch, Arabic, Chinese, Jewish, Greek, Portuguese and Roman roots in the forgotten port of Muziris from 1st Century BC onward.

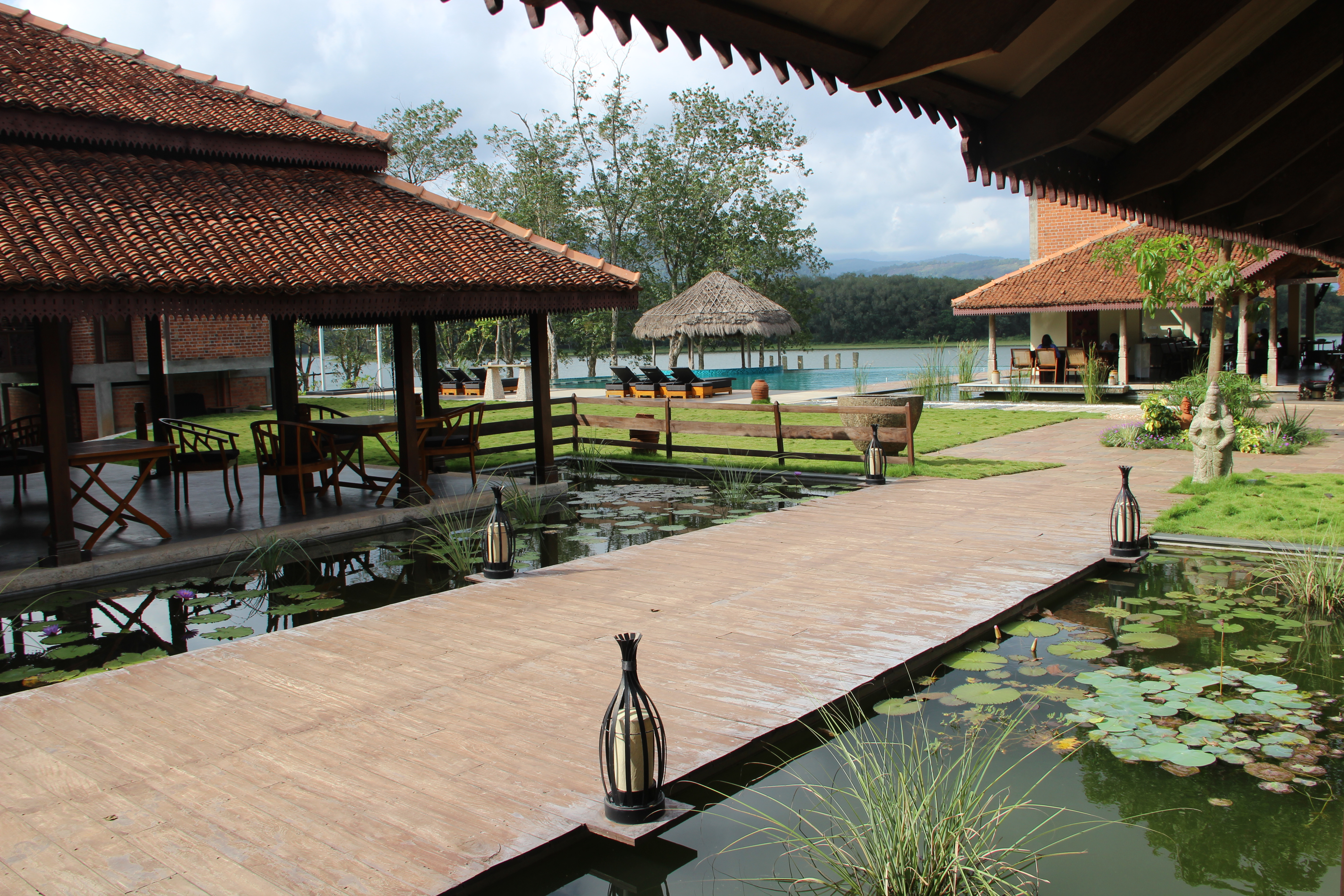
Anantya Resort

The restoration of Cheraman Juma Mosque, the oldest mosque in India, removing all the modern appendages is an offshoot of the Muziris Heritage Project. The decision to replace the new chapel in the Kottappuram market with the old was taken by the congregation. The mosque and chapel are just two of the structures that are being transformed as a result of this initiative, coming up in a 150 km (93.21 mi) 150 square km area in central Kerala, in Ernakulam and Thrissur districts.

When the project is completed, it will be a walk through 3,000 years of history of the southern Indian state of Kerala. The place is very special since this is where Jews, Arabs, Greeks, Portuguese, Dutch and the British etc. came together. Three religions came to India through this port namely Judaism, Christianity and Islam.

The Muziris Heritage Project set a precedent in India for adopting an integrated approach to heritage conservation and regional development.

== Awards ==
- 1986 Charles Wallace (India) Trust Award
- 2002 Designer of the Year Award by Inside Outside Magazine
- 2011 Celebration of Architecture Award by Inside Outside Magazine
- 2016 Lifetime Achievement Award by Estrade
- 2017 Scroll of Honour 2017 by Realty Plus
- 2017 Editor's Choice for Exemplary Body of Work, Trends Excellence Award

== Bibliography ==
- Benny Kuriakose, Nupur Prothi Khanna, Malvika Bajaj Saini (eds), Guidelines for Preparation of a Heritage Management Plan, 2010 .
- Benny Kuriakose, Conserving Timber Structures in India, 2007 .
- Benny Kuriakose, Habitat Mapping of Chinnangudi – A Study of Chinnangudi Village in Connection with Tsunami Reconstruction Project, 2006 .
- Abraham, Rajesh (Director), Ace Architect – Benny Kuriakose, a Documentary on different projects designed by Benny Kuriakose.
