= Kyriakos (name) =

Kyriakos (Greek: Κυριάκος) is the name of Christian saint Cyriacus the Anchorite (or Kyriakos).

An alternative transliteration and spelling is Kyriacos and Cyriacus. A similar surname, which is Kyriakos in the genitive, is Kyriakou.

Other people with the name include:

== People with the given name ==
- Kyriakos of Makuria, ruler of the Nubian kingdom of Makuria in 8th century
- Kyriakos Mavronikolas (born 1955), Cypriot politician and government minister
- Kyriakos Mitsotakis (born 1968), Greek politician and Prime Minister of Greece
- Kyriakos Onisiforou (born 1951), Cypriot-born Greek sprinter
- Kyriakos Papachronis (born 1960), also known as the "Ogre of Drama" (ο δράκος της Δράμας), a Greek serial killer
- Kyriakos Papadopoulos (born 1992), Greek footballer
- Kyriakos Pittakis (1798–1863), Greek archaeologist
- Kyriakos Sfetsas (1945–2026), Greek composer
- Kyriakos Tamvakis (born 1950), Greek theoretical physicist
- Kyriakos Velopoulos (born 1965), Greek politician and MP

== People with the surname ==
- Anastasios Kyriakos (born 1978), Greek footballer
- Diomidis Kyriakos (1811–1869), Greek author and politician

== See also ==
- Kuriakose
- Cyriac
- Kyrie
