= Kuriakose =

Kuriakose (Syriac: ܩܘܪܝܩܘܣ) is a common male first name and surname among Saint Thomas Christians, mainly from central part of the state of Kerala in India and surrounding areas. Derivatives of the name Kuriakose include Kurian and Kurien. This name is a variant of names found among Middle Eastern countries among Christians such as Assyrians and Arabs, Kyriakos in Greece and Cyprus, Cyriacus in Italy and Cyr in France.

The name Kuriakose is derived from the Syriac Aramaic name ܩܘܪܝܩܘܣ (quryāqōs) which itself is from Greek. The name is believed to have originated from Saint Quriaqos who is known in both Syriac and Latin liturgies The meaning of Kuriakose most closely matches to 'of the Lord'.

== Various forms of Kuriakose ==
Names	Areas of Concentration
Kuriakose / Kuryakose / Kuriyakose / Kurian / Kurien	India (South Western region)
Kuryakus / Kuryakos / Quriakos / Qoryaqos/ Quryaqos / Kiryakos / Koriakos	Iraq (Nineveh Plains area), Turkey (Eastern region), Iran (Urmia area), Syria (North Eastern region), Lebanon, Armenia
Kyriakos / Kuriakos / Kiryakos	Greece, Israel, Palestine
Cyriacus / Cyricus	Italy
Cyr	France
Kyriacos	Egypt

== Notable people with name Kuriakose and its derivatives ==
- Arackaparambil Kurien Antony, former Defense Minister of India
- Benny Kuriakose, conservation consultant
- Eden Kuriakose, Indian actress
- Kuriakose Elias Chavara, founder of Carmelites of Mary Immaculate and a Catholic Saint
- Kuriakose Ranga, Indian actor
- Thomas Kurian, CEO of Google Cloud and Former President of Oracle Corporation
- Verghese Kurien, founder of the Gujarat Co-operative Milk Marketing Federation
- Pius C. Kuriakose, former Chief Justice of Sikkim High Court
- Jomon Kuriakose, chef in UK

== See also ==
- Saint Thomas Christians
- Syrian Christians
- Assyrians in Iran
- Assyrians in Iraq
