= Cyriacus (name) =

Cyriacus is a given name of Greek origin. The Greek Κυριακός (Kyriakos) means "belonging to the lord". It has strong Christian connotations and is one of the most common names found in Christian inscriptions from ancient Rome. The Latin Dominicus (whence Dominic) has the same meaning and may originate as a translation of the Greek name.

The reduced form Cyricus gave rise to the Latin spelling Quiricus. Other derived names include Cyrianus, Cyricius and Cyrillus (whence Cyril). Many Latin spelling variants are known: Quiriacus, Quiracus, Curiacus, etc. The feminine form of the name is Cyriaca.

Cyriacus, Quiriacus, or variations, is also the name of:

- Cyriacus of Jerusalem (2nd century), bishop and saint
- Cyriacus of Alexandria (3rd century), two martyrs, saints, and companions of Faustus, Abibus and Dionysius of Alexandria
- Cyriacus I of Byzantium (3rd century), bishop of Byzantium
- Quiriacus of Ostia (3rd century), Bishop of Ostia, Christian martyr and saint
- Cyricus/, 4th-century Christian child martyr
- Cyriacus, 4th century Roman nobleman and Christian martyr under Diocletian
- Judas Cyriacus (4th century), also known as Cyriacus of Ancona, a saint, martyr, and patron saint of Ancona, Italy
- Cyriacus the Anchorite (5th century), a Greek monk and saint
- Cyriacus II of Constantinople (7th century), Ecumenical Patriarch of Constantinople
- Quriaqos of Tagrit (8th–9th century), Syriac Orthodox Patriarch of Antioch
- Cyriacus of Carthage (11th century), archbishop of Carthage
- Kirakos Gandzaketsi or Cyriacus of Gandzak (1200–1271), an Armenian historian
- Cyriacus of Ancona or Ciriaco de' Pizzicolli (15th century), traveller and antiquarian in the Aegean
- Kuriakose Elias Chavara, 19th century Indian Christian saint and social reformer.
- Cyriak or Cyriak Harris (21st century), an English freelance animator

== See also ==
- Kyriakos (name)
- Kyriacos
- Kuriakose
- Cyriack
- Saint Cyriakus, Gernrode, a medieval church in Gernrode, Saxony-Anhalt, Germany
- Canons Regular of the Penitence of the Blessed Martyrs (Cyriaks), a religious order named after Judas Cyriacus
