= Berinag tea =

Former tea brand from Uttarakhand, India

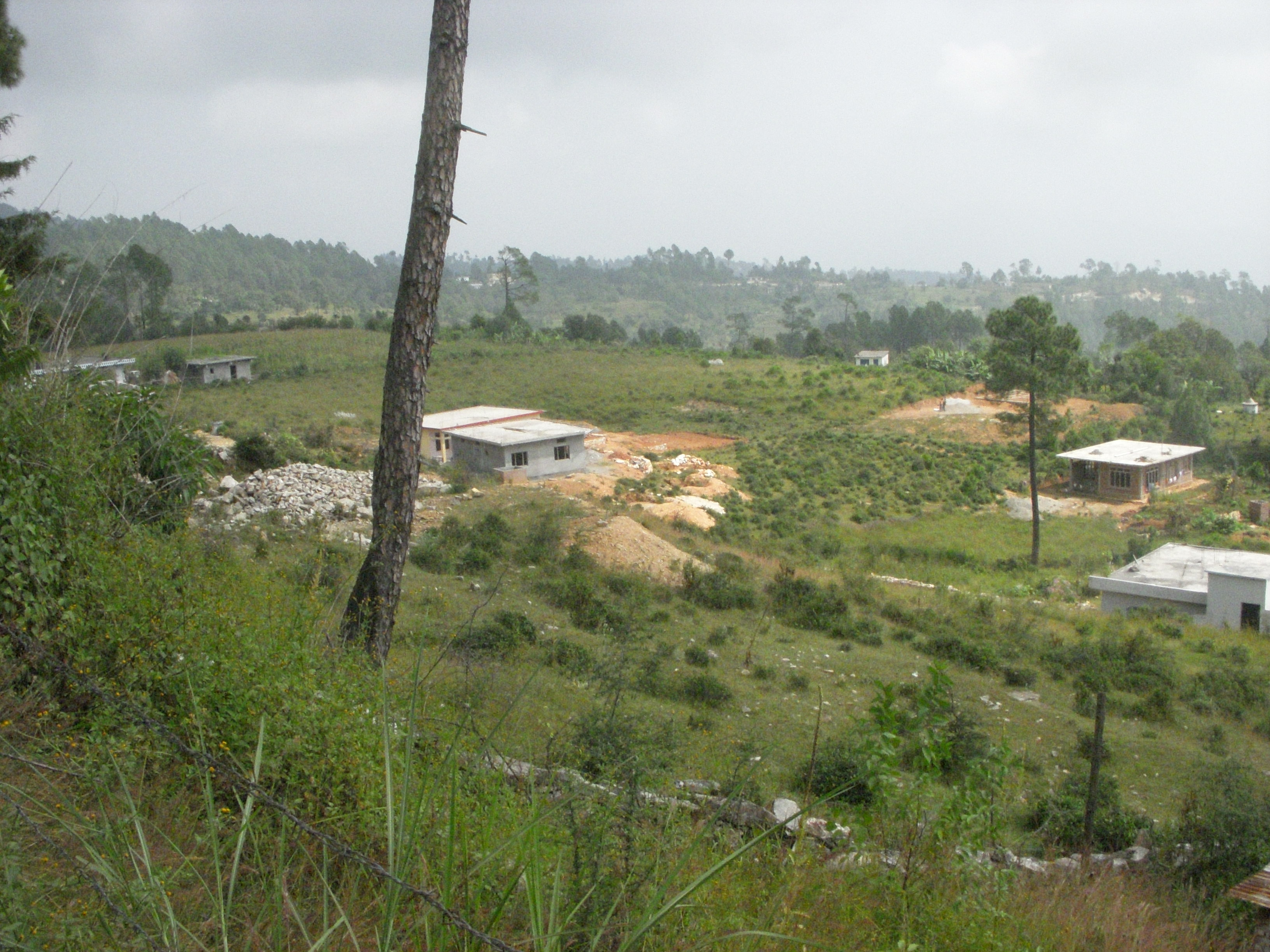
Tea plants, on the way to Berinag

Berinag Tea was a highly sought-after tea in London tea houses, As documented by William McKay Aitken and famed man of taste Laurie Baker. Berinag Tea estate was bought from Kedar Dutt Pant by Thakur Dan Singh Bist (also spelled "Bisht"). It was distributed by D.S. Bist & Sons, A company owned by Thakur Dan Singh Bist who is a billionaire philanthropist in India. From the late 1900s till his death in 1964, Thakur Dan Singh Bisht sought after the tea in China, India and London. However, after his death the tea estate was taken over by settlers and encroaches. The town of Berinag became the tea estate. Berinag was home to one of the best tea gardens in the country until the late Thakur brother, Dan Singh Bisht died.

Berinag tea was made from the leaves of a wild plant which grows in many localities in the Himalayas. It was grown in the most eastern Himalayan district in the state of Uttarakhand, India, but is now only grown in Chaukori which is famous for its tea gardens established by the Britishers. The trade name Berinag tea originates from a Chinese variety. Laurie Baker, the connoisseur, loved Berinag tea remembering it throughout his life.

In 2023, it received Geographical Identification tag from the government of India.

== Discovery by Berinag Tea Company ==
Berinag tea is a well-known brick-tea made of leaves compressed into a solid mass. It is very popular in Tibet, where the Daba Jongpen have a habit of passing it off as the Chinese article.

An expert committee was appointed in 1827 to investigate the possibility of the successful cultivation of tea in Kumaon. A tea estate was set up there during the 1950s. The manager of the Berinag tea company discovered the secret of manufacturing of Chinese brick tea, and his tea was considered to be far superior to the Chinese variety. In 1907, he disposed of about 54 quintals of it but gradually the business declined, and by 1960 only a small tea garden had survived.

== Brewing and serving ==
Along with the label 'Berinag Tea' on the packaging, there are instructions on how to achieve the best brew: "Allow one tea spoonful to each cup and proportionally to the pot and infuse for eight to ten minutes." Fresh milk can also be added for best results.

Unlike other kinds of tea, Berinag tea is low in color which accounts for the delay in infusion.

== Label and packaging ==
In his book Footloose in the Himalaya, William McKay Aitken describes the label with an advertisement that states "Berenag Tea Revives You." At the top is the claim "Fresh From Garden" and below, the garden itself is depicted. Beneath tree snow peaks runs the long factory building mat Chaukori complete with a red tin roof. Picking the tea bushes are three ladies, all with black bobbed hair. The girl in the foreground looks convent-educated, and carries on her back the long narrow wicker basket peculiar to Kumaun. The girl's dress, salwar kameez is more of a Chinese than Indian style, and sports a mandarin collar.

== Additional information ==
During the British rule in India, land re-organization was carried out in 1823 and boundaries of villages were drawn. In those days, the British were not allowed to keep personal properties in Kumaon. Hence, they raised a demand to let them have private property. In 1827, Dr Royale requested to the government that the vast land of Kumaon, where there is no farming being done, should be given to Europeans for tea gardening. Accordingly, a tea committee was constituted in India in 1834. In 1837, the British parliament passed a bill allowing them to keep private property in India. Lord Baton, commissioner of Kumaon & Garhwal, issued orders that the hilltops with suitable climatic conditions may be given to British free of cost. This would allow them to stay there and carry out tea gardening, as people there found some tea plants growing naturally without any seeding.

Among all the gardens in Kumaon, the Berinag and Chaukori gardens were most popular for the quality and taste of the tea. Chaukori and Berinag gardens were later taken over by Thakur Dan Singh Bist. By chance, the manager of the Berinag Tea Company discovered the secret to manufacturing Chinese Brick Tea. His tea was admitted by unprejudiced Bhotia traders to be far superior to the Chinese article imported into Western Tibet via Lhasa.

Sadly the brand is forgotten except by an older generation. The accidental death of the magnate Dan Singh Bist in 1964 left the brand without a successor, and seven young girls. As the estate was taken over by encroachment, becoming the town and the newly declared municipality of Berinag. As William McKay Aitken notes, 'Berinag tea was once highly sought after by London tea blenders.'
