= Mitraniketan Viswanathan =

Indian social reformer

Mitraniketan K. Viswanathan
- Born: 8 February 1928 (age 98); Vellanad, Thiruvananthapuram, Kerala, India
- Died: 28 April 2014 (aged 86); Thiruvananthapuram
- Occupations: Social reformer, Philanthropist, Environmentalist
- Spouse: Sethulaxmi
- Children: Asha, Chithra, Beena
- Parent(s): R. Krishna Panickar; G. Karthyayani
- Awards: Padma Shri; K. P. Goenka Award for Environment; Platinum Jubilee Endowment Trust Award; Jamnalal Bajaj Award; Rabindra Puraskar; Henry Dunant Red Cross Award

Mitraniketan K. Viswanathan (8 February 1928 – 28 April 2014) was an Indian social reformer, philanthropist, and environmentalist in Kerala, India. He founded Mitraniketan, a non governmental organization in Vellanadu, Thiruvananthapuram, in 1956.

== Biography ==
Viswanathan was born on 8 February 1928 in Vellanad, Thiruvananthapuram District, Kerala, India. He completed his schooling in Thiruvananthapuram and went on to join Visva-Bharati University, founded by Rabindranath Tagore, where he completed his Siksha Bhavana degree in 1953. He further pursued his studies in the United States, the United Kingdom, and Scandinavia. It was during his time in the US that he came into contact with Arthur E. Morgan, whose influence played a significant role in shaping Viswanathan's later years.

On his return to India, he founded Mitraniketan, The Home of Friends, in 1955. The organization focuses on innovation, training, and extension in the fields of community development, environment, science, education, and appropriate technology. Over time, the organization has expanded to encompass 60 acres of land, which includes Mitraniketan People's College, a Krishi Vigyan Kendra (KVK), a training centre for women, a fully equipped bakery, a pottery centre, and a technology transfer programme.

He was the patron of Kerala Voluntary Action League (KAVAL), a network of non-governmental organizations. Furthermore, he chaired various organizations, attended conferences in India and abroad and served as a member of many government boards.

Viswanathan inspired many with his Gandhi-like commitment to simplicity and the poor. In 1990-91, Daniele Giovannucci, who later founded the Committee on Sustainability Assessment (COSA), worked at Mitraniketan alongside Professor Will Alexander. They explored the paradox of remarkable levels of human development coexisting with high levels of poverty. The Mitraniketan experience provided insights for Giovannucci, Alexander, and the researchers they gathered there, emphasizing the importance of universal education and literacy, relative gender equality in a formerly matrilineal society, and collaborative utilization of simple yet effective technologies. This enigma initially came to light through the research of scientists Richard Franke and Barbara Chasin, who began studying the region in the late 1980s (refer to "Radical Reform As Development in an Indian State," for example), and was further highlighted in a short article by Bill McKibben.

Viswanathan died on 28 April 2014, succumbing to heart-related problems at a private clinic in Thiruvananthapuram.

== Awards ==
He was a winner of many awards and fellowships, including Platinum Jubilee Endowment Trust Award by Indian Merchants Chamber, K P Goenka Award for Environment by Asian Cables Foundation and The Jamnalal Bajaj Award for application of science and technology in rural areas. He was awarded Padmashri by Government of India in 2009.

- Padmashri by Government of India - 2009
- Sevanaratnam Award – 2002
- Best Krishi Vigyan Kendra Award - 1998-99
- Arch Bishop Mar Gregorious Memorial Award - 1997
- M. K. K. Nair Award for Excellence in Social Work - 1997
- Chellayyan Nadar Award for Excellence in Social Work - 1996
- TRASS Award by Trivandrum Social Service Society for Excellence in Social Work - 1994
- Jamnalal Bajaj Award for application of Science and Technology in rural areas - 1992
- Ratindra Puraskar by Visva-Bharati University for contributions to rural development through the application of Science- 1991
- K. P. Goenka Award for Environment by Asian Cables Foundation - 1987
- Platinum Jubilee Endowment Trust Award by Indian Merchants' Chamber - 1986
- Sahodaran Sevaretna Puraskar
- Henry Dunant Red Cross Award
