= Laurie Baker =

Indian architect

Laurence Wilfred Baker
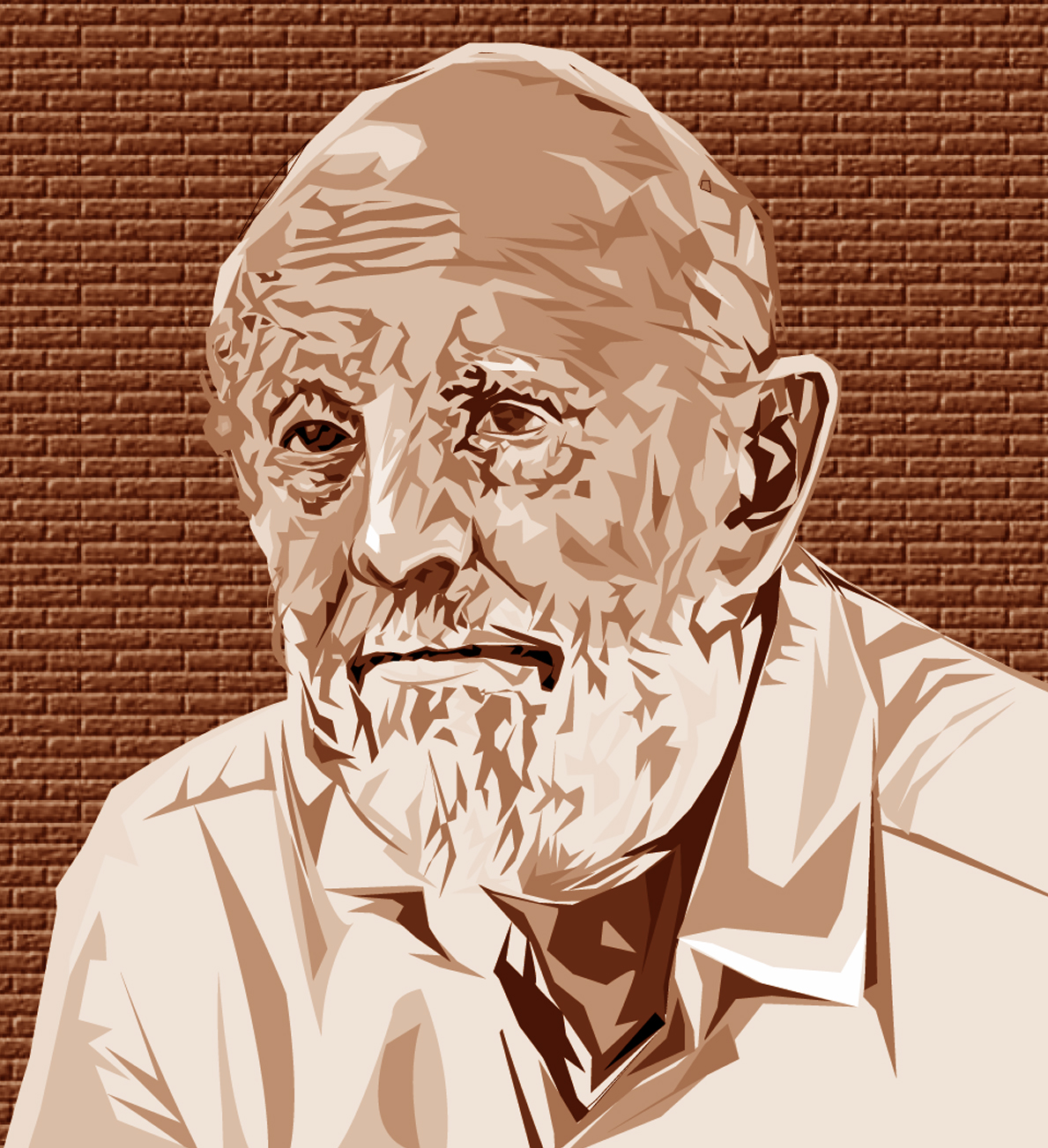
- Drawing of Laurie Baker
- Born: 2 March 1917; Birmingham, England
- Died: 1 April 2007 (aged 90); Thiruvananthapuram, Kerala, India
- Citizenship: United Kingdom (former); India
- Occupation: Architect
- Awards: Padma Shri, MBE
- Buildings: School of Drama & Fine Arts Theatre (Thrissur), Centre for Development Studies (Trivandrum), Literacy Village (Lucknow), Sálim Ali Centre for Ornithology and Natural History (SACON) (Coimbatore), Chitralekha Film Studio (Aakulam), The Indian Coffee House (Trivandrum), Pallikoodam School (Kottayam), Loyola Chapel & Auditorium (Trivandrum), Attapadi Hill Area Development Society (Attapadi), DakshinaChitra (Chennai), Chengalchoola Slum dwelling units (Trivandrum), Nirmithi Kendra (Aakulam), Tourist Centre (Ponmudi), Mitraniketan (Vagamon)
- Website: lauriebaker.net

Lawrence Wilfred "Laurie" Baker (2 March 1917 – 1 April 2007) was a British-born Indian architect who focussed on cost-effective energy-efficient architecture and designs that maximized space, ventilation and light.

He was a pioneer of sustainable architecture as well as organic architecture, incorporating in his designs even in the late 1960s, concepts such as rain-water harvesting, minimizing usage of energy-inefficient building materials, minimizing damage to the building site and seamlessly merging with the surroundings. Influenced by Mahatma Gandhi and his own experiences in the remote Himalayas, he promoted the revival of regional building practices and use of local materials; and combined this with a design philosophy that emphasized a responsible and prudent use of resources and energy. Due to his social and humanitarian efforts, his belief in simplicity in design and in life, and his staunch Quaker belief in non-violence, he has been called the "Gandhi of architecture".

He moved to India in 1945 in part as an architect associated with a leprosy mission and continued to live and work in India for over 50 years. He became an Indian citizen in 1989 and resided in Thiruvananthapuram (Trivandrum), Kerala from 1969 and served as the Director of COSTFORD (Centre of Science and Technology for Rural Development), an organisation to promote low-cost housing.

In 1981, the Royal University of the Netherlands conferred an honour upon him for "outstanding work in a Third World country". In 1983 he was conferred with an MBE at Buckingham Palace. In 1990, the Government of India awarded him the Padma Shri for his meritorious service in the field of architecture. In 1992, he was awarded the Roll of Honour by the United Nations.

In 1988, he was granted Indian citizenship, the only honour he actively pursued in his life.

== Early life ==
Baker was born into a staunch Methodist family, the youngest son of Birmingham Gas Department's chief accountant, Charles Frederick Baker and Millie Baker. His early schooling was at King Edwards Grammar School. His elder brothers, Leonard and Norman studied law, and he had a sister, Edna who was the oldest of them all. In his teens Baker began to question what religion meant to him and decided to become a Quaker, since it was closer to what he believed in. Baker studied architecture at Birmingham Institute of Art and Design, Birmingham, and graduated in 1937, aged 20, in a period of political unrest in Europe.

During the Second World War, as a conscientious objector, he served in the Friends Ambulance Unit. After a short spell on the south coast of England and mostly looking after naval casualties he was sent to China as a trained anesthetist with a surgical team, mainly to cope with civilian casualties in the war between China and Japan. However, after a year or two of this war area activity, he found himself having to deal with derelict civilians suffering from Hansen's disease — the medical term for leprosy. He was seconded to a hospital formerly run by an order of German sisters who were all interned by the Chinese as enemy aliens.

The War took its toll on Baker, and he was ordered back in 1943 to England to recuperate. But fate took a hand in delaying his departure by about three months as he waited for a boat in Bombay. During this time he stayed with a Quaker friend, who also happened to be a good friend of the Mahatma. Baker attended many of Gandhiji's talks and prayer-meetings — which eventually led to a more-than-casual friendship between them. This was also the time of the Gandhi-Jinnah talks and the height of the 'Quit India' movement. So though he felt the need to return to India, to settle and work here, Baker was initially discouraged by the nationwide animosity to the Raj and to all Westerners. But the Mahatma reassured him that though the Raj must quit, concerned individuals would always find a welcome place to work with Indians. In fact, Gandhiji showed great interest in the leprosy work in China, and the lives of the ordinary people there. "It was also from the influence of Mahatma Gandhi I learnt that the real people you should be building for, and who are in need, are the 'ordinary' people — those living in villages and in the congested areas of our cities." Gandhi's idea was that it should be possible to build a home with materials found within a five-mile radius of a site. This was to have a great influence in his later life.

His initial commitment to India in 1945 had him working as an architect for the World Leprosy Mission, an international and inter-denominational organisation dedicated to the care of those suffering from leprosy. The organisation wanted a builder-architect-engineer. As new medicines for the treatment of the disease were becoming more prevalent, Baker's responsibilities were focused on converting or replacing asylums once used to house the ostracised sufferers of the disease (called lepers) into treatment hospitals.

== India ==
Moving to India in 1945, Baker began to work on leprosy centre buildings across the country, basing himself out of Faizabad, Uttar Pradesh. Baker quickly found the missionary lifestyle - ostentatious bungalows, socialite gatherings, and the plethora of servants waiting hand and foot - too luxurious and not in line with his values and instead decided to stay with the Indian doctor P.J. Chandy and his family. The sister of his host, Elizabeth Jacob (Baker called her "Kuni"), worked as a doctor in Hyderabad with the same leprosy organisation. The two met when Elizabeth came to Faizabad to perform an operation on her brother and to take care of the hospital duties whilst he recuperated.

Baker and Jacob found themselves sharing common beliefs and decided to marry. However, as there was considerable resistance from both their families, they decided to wait. Work and travel allowed them only brief periods together, and they finally got married in 1948.

For their honeymoon, they traveled to the district of Pithoragarh. Once the locals found out that Elizabeth was a doctor, people came to visit the couple in droves. So immediate was the need for medical help in that remote region that the Bakers decided to build a home and hospital on the slopes of one of the hills on a piece of land no one wanted and stayed there to help the people. The Bakers lived in Pithoragarh for sixteen years before moving to Vagamon in Kerala in 1963 and some years later to Trivandrum.

Initially, their time in Pithoragarh was lonely but they quickly became friends with the locals, including the "maldar" Dan Singh Bist who "owned most of Pithoragarh" and helped them in their charitable work. Elizabeth Baker, in her memoir of her time together with Laurie Baker, The Other Side of Laurie Baker, discussed the Berinag tea, the principle produce of Bisht, that they shared that was "very special" to them, as Laurie was a man of exquisite and simple taste, who always loved the simple pleasures of life. In 1988, Laurie Baker became an Indian citizen.

== Architecture ==
While at Pithoragarh, Baker found his English construction education to be inadequate for the types of issues and materials he was faced with: termites and the yearly monsoon, as well as laterite, cow dung, and mud walls, respectively, Baker had no choice but to observe and learn from the methods and practices of vernacular architecture. He soon learned that the indigenous architecture and methods of these places were in fact the only viable means to deal with local problems.

Inspired by his discoveries (which he modestly admitted were 'discoveries' only for him, and mere common knowledge to those who developed the practices he observed), he realized that unlike the Modernist architectural movement that was gaining popularity at the time denouncing all that was old just because it was old didn't make sense. Baker adopted local craftsmanship, traditional techniques and materials but then combined it with modern design principles and technology wherever it made sense to do so.

This prudent adoption of modern technology helped local architecture retain its cultural identity and kept costs low due to the use of local materials. It also revived the local economy due to the use of local labour for both construction of the buildings and for manufacture of construction materials such as brick and lime surkhi.

Baker built several schools, chapels and hospitals in the hills. Eventually, as word spread of his cost-effective buildings more clients from the plains started to contact Baker. One of the early clients was Welthy Fisher, who sought to set up a 'Literacy Village' in which she intended to use puppetry, music and art as teaching methods to help illiterate and newly-literate adults add to their skills. An ageing woman who risked her health to visit Laurie, she refused to leave until she received plans for the village.

More and more hospital commissions were received as medical professionals realised that the surroundings for their patients were as much a part of the healing process as any other form of treatment, and that Baker seemed the only architect who cared enough to become familiarised with how to build what made Indian patients comfortable with those surroundings. His presence would also soon be required on-site at Ms. Fisher's "Village," and he became well known for his constant presence on the construction sites of all his projects, often finalising designs through hand-drawn instructions to masons and labourers on how to achieve certain design solutions.

== Architectural style ==
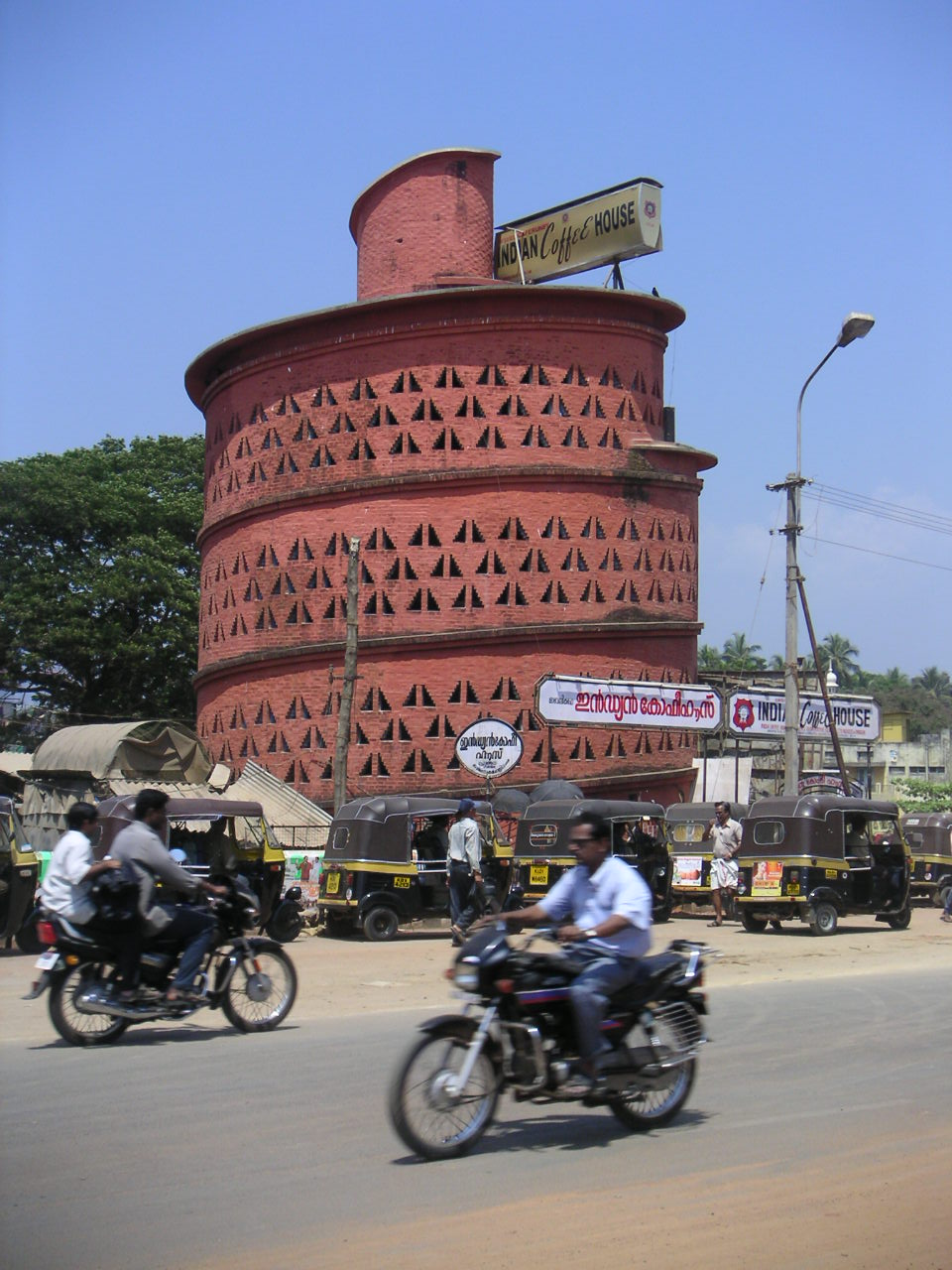
The Indian Coffee House in Thiruvananthapuram, designed by Laurie Baker

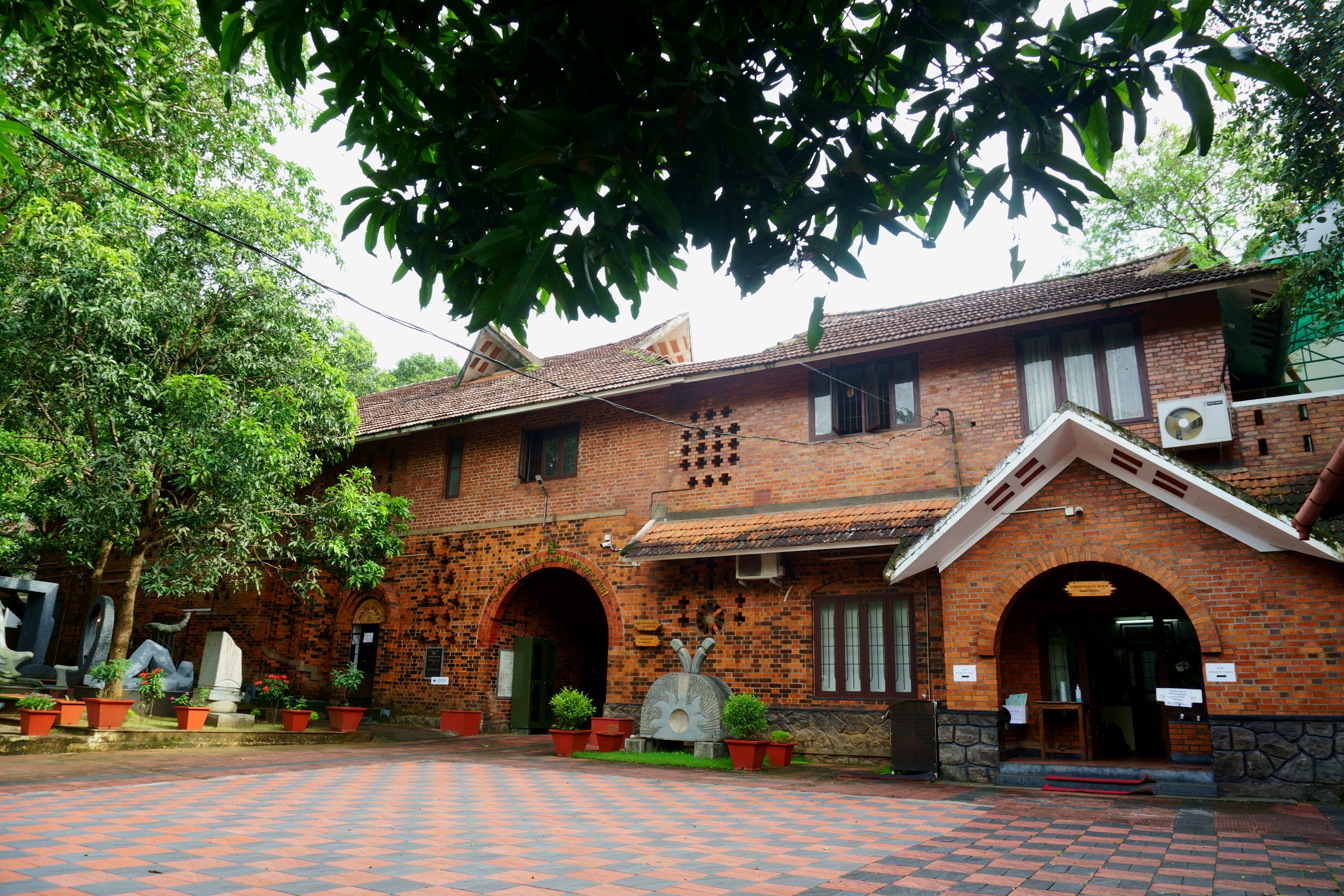
The Kerala Lalithakala Akademi Head Office Complex at Thrissur, designed by Laurie Baker

Throughout his practice, Baker developed a signature style in designing and building low cost, high quality, beautiful homes, with a great portion of his work suited to or built for lower-middle to lower class clients. He derived creatively from pre-existing local culture and building traditions while keeping his designs minimal with judicious and frugal use of resources. His buildings tend to emphasise prolific – at times virtuosic – masonry construction, instilling privacy and evoking history with brick jali walls, a perforated brick screen which invites a natural air flow to cool the buildings' interior, in addition to creating intricate patterns of light and shadow. Another significant Baker feature is irregular, pyramid-like structures on roofs, with one side left open and tilting into the wind. Baker's designs invariably have traditional Indian sloping roofs and terracotta Mangalore tile shingling with gables and vents allowing rising hot air to escape. Curved walls enter Baker's architectural vocabulary as a means to enclose more volume at lower material cost than straight walls, and for Laurie, "building [became] more fun with the circle." A testament to his frugality, Baker was often seen rummaging through salvage heaps looking for suitable building materials, door and window frames, sometimes hitting a stroke of luck as evidenced by the intricately carved entry to the Chitralekha Film Studio (Aakulam, Trivandrum, 1974–76): a capricious architectural element found in a junk heap.

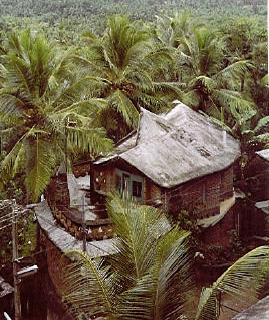
Baker's works, such as this house, blend seamlessly into the natural settings.

Baker made many simple suggestions for cost reduction including the use of Rat trap bond for brick walls, having bends in walls that increased the strength and provided readymade shelves, thin concrete roofs and even simple precautions like shifting dug up soil into the built area rather that out of it. He advocated the use of low energy consuming mud walls, using holes in the wall to get light, using overlaid brick over doorways, incorporating places to sit into the structure, simpler windows and a variety of roof construction approaches. He liked bare brick surfaces and considered plastering and other embellishments as superfluous.

Baker's architectural method is one of improvisation, in which initial drawings have only an idealistic link to the final construction, with most of the accommodations and design choices being made on-site by the architect himself. Compartments for milk bottles near the doorstep, windowsills that double as bench surfaces, and a heavy emphasis on taking cues from the natural condition of the site are just some examples. His Quaker-instilled respect for nature led him to let the idiosyncrasies of a site inform his architectural improvisations, rarely is a topography line marred or a tree uprooted. This saves construction cost as well, since working around difficult site conditions is much more cost-effective than clear-cutting. ("I think it's a waste of money to level a well-moulded site") Resistant to "high-technology" that addresses building environment issues by ignoring natural environment, at the Centre for Development Studies (Trivandrum, 1971) Baker created a cooling system by placing a high, latticed, brick wall near a pond that uses air pressure differences to draw cool air through the building. Various features of his work such as using recycled material, natural environment control and frugality of design may be seen as sustainable architecture or green building with its emphasis on sustainability. His responsiveness to never-identical site conditions quite obviously allowed for the variegation that permeates his work.

== Death and legacy ==
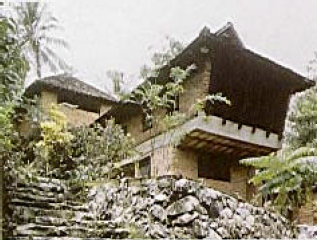
The Hamlet at Nalanchira in Thiruvananthapuram, which was home to Baker and his wife since 1970. The house, which resides on a hill top, was constructed by Baker.

Laurie Baker died at 7:30 am on 1 April 2007, aged 90, survived by wife Elizabeth, son Tilak, daughters Vidya and Heidi and his grandchildren Vineet, Lisa and Tejal. Until the end he continued to work in and around his home in Trivandrum, though health concerns had kept his famous on-site physical presence to a minimum. His designing and writing were done mostly at his home. His approach to architecture steadily gained appreciation as architectural sentiment creaks towards place-making over modernising or stylising. As a result of this more widespread acceptance, however, the "Baker Style" home is gaining popularity, much to Baker's own chagrin, since he felt that the 'style' being commoditised is merely the inevitable manifestation of the cultural and economic imperatives of the region in which he worked, not a solution that could be applied whole-cloth to any outside situation. Laurie Baker's architecture focused on retaining a site's natural character, and economically minded indigenous construction, and the seamless integration of local culture that has been very inspirational.

Many architects studied and were inspired by the work of Laurie Baker. The workers and students called him "daddy". Laurie Baker's writings were published and are available through COSTFORD (the Center Of Science and Technology For Rural Development), the voluntary organisation where he was Master Architect and carried out many of his later projects.

He is mentioned fondly in the 2025 memoir of Arundhati Roy, Mother Mary Comes to Me.

== Awards ==
- 1981: D.Litt. conferred by the Royal University of Netherlands for outstanding work in the developing countries.
- 1983: Order of the British Empire, MBE
- 1987: Received the first Indian National Habitat Award
- 1988: Received Indian Citizenship
- 1989: Indian Institute of Architects Outstanding Architect of the Year
- 1990: Received the Padma Sri
- 1990: Great Master Architect of the Year
- 1992: UNO Habitat Award & UN Roll of Honour
- 1993: International Union of Architects (IUA) Award
- 1993: Sir Robert Matthew Prize for Improvement of Human Settlements
- 1994: People of the Year Award
- 1995: Awarded Doctorate from the University of Central England
- 1998: Awarded Doctorate from Sri Venkateshwara University
- 2001: Coinpar MR Kurup Endowment Award
- 2003: Basheer Puraskaram
- 2003: D.Litt. from the Kerala University
- 2005: Kerala Government Certificate of Appreciation
- 2006: L-Ramp Award of Excellence
- 2006: Nominated for the Pritzker Prize (considered the Nobel Prize in Architecture)

== See also ==
- Hassan Fathy
- Geoffrey Bawa
- Muzharul Islam
- Charles Correa
