= Kyriacos =

Kyriacos (Greek: Κυριάκος) is a Greek male given name, meaning 'of the lord' (derived from Greek: κύριος, romanized: kyrios, lit. 'lord').

An alternative transliteration and spelling is Kyriakos.

People with this name include:

- Kyriacos Costa Nicolaou (born 1946), Cypriot-American chemist known for synthesizing Taxol
- Kyriacos A. Athanasiou (born 1960), bioengineer
- Kyriacos C. Markides, (born 1942), professor of sociology, University of Maine
- Kyriacos Chailis (born 1978), Cypriot striker
- Kyriacos Kyriacou (born 1989), Cypriot defender
- Kyriacos Pavlou, (born 1986), Cypriot midfielder
- Kyriacos Triantaphyllides (born 1944), Cypriot politician and Member of the European Parliament

== See also ==
- Cyriacus (name) for uses of the Latinized form
- Kyrie
- Kuriakose
