= Centre of Science and Technology for Rural Development =

Indian agricultural development organization

Centre of Science and Technology For Rural Development (COSTFORD) is a Thrissur city-based organisation that gives technological assistance to people in alternative building technology. The organization strives to change the social, economic and political position of the poor by providing low-cost and eco-friendly housing technology using participatory, transparent and gender-sensitive processes. COSTFORD's headquarters are in Thrissur, and it operates from another 15 sub-centers, 14 in Kerala and 1 in Gurgaon.

== History ==
The organisation was founded Laurie Baker, British-born Indian architect; C. Achutha Menon, the former Chief Minister of Kerala; Dr K. N. Raj, an economist and Dr T. R. Chandradutt. COSTFORD was registered as a non-profit voluntary organization in 1984 and started its construction activities in 1986. After their formation, COSTFORD undertook a socio-economic survey in 3 different panchayats in Kerala and realized that there was a need for cost-effective housing. Hence, in 1987, they took up the housing scheme that was launched by the then district collector, which was a full subsidy scheme for the construction of core houses within a budget of 9200 rupees per house for beneficiaries who were below the poverty line. This scheme was completed entirely using the alternative technologies promoted by Laurie baker and paved the way for COSTFORD for acquiring further such projects. Since then, COSTFORD has assisted with numerous buildings of all types including institutional buildings, housing schemes, and private residences.

In 1996, the state government launched the decentralized planning scheme under the name of the People's Planning Campaign. COSTFORD was selected to implement the total housing scheme in the district of Thrissur, along with the Nirmiti Kendra and in Trivandrum along with Habitat Technology group and the Nirmiti Kendra. Till date COSTFORD has been able to construct 15,000 building through this project. Some of the project areas include the tribal hills of Attapady where they are in charge of 5 hamlets, the Thankasheri fishing village with 158 houses, all constructed with different plans and the rehabilitation of Chengal Chulah slums, the biggest slum in Trivandrum.

The office of the Trivandrum sub-center is currently headed by Mr. Sajan and his wife Mrs. Shailaja, who is an architect. They are assisted by a team of architects, engineers and trainees along with the administrative staff. T.R. Chandradutt, who was the director of COSTFORD for 34 years, died on 20 March 2018 of heart disease and cancer.

== Methods ==
COSTFORD uses a variety of techniques that were pioneered by Laurie Baker, including rat trap bond walls, filler slab roofing, brick jalli, patch-pointing, and exposed brickwork. COSTFORD strongly believes in preservation of the environmental resources and promotes the use of energy-efficient materials and which minimize the use of energy-intensive materials such as cement, steel, and glass. They use fired bricks or mud blocks stabilized with lime and rice husks for masonry. They also experiment with renewable building materials such as bamboo, which they use as reinforcement for the foundations with lime concrete or for slabs where they use bamboo as an exposed form with concrete on top.
