= DakshinaChitra =

Heritage village in Tamil Nadu, India

- Location within Tamil Nadu
- Established: 14 December 1996 (29 years ago)
- Location: East Coast Road, Muttukadu, Chennai, India
- Coordinates: 12.822423°N 80.243098°E
- Type: Heritage centre
- Collection size: 4,220 artefacts and 1,000,000 pictures
- Founder: Madras Craft Foundation
- Curator: Deborah Thiagarajan
- Architects: Laurie Baker; Benny Kuriakose
- Website: dakshinachitra.net

DakshinaChitra ("a picture of the south") is a living-history museum in the Indian state of Tamil Nadu, dedicated to South Indian heritage and culture. It is located 25 kilometres (16 mi) to the south of Chennai. Opened to the public on 14 December 1996, the museum was founded and is being managed by the Madras Craft Foundation (MCF). The MCF was established in 1984. Deborah Thiagarajan, an Indian art historian of American origin, governs the museum. The museum is built on 10 acres (4.0 ha) of land taken on a 33-year lease from the Government of Tamil Nadu. Located at Muttukadu, on the East Coast Road connecting Chennai and Pondicherry, the site overlooks Bay of Bengal.

Developed as a heritage village, DakshinaChitra has an array of displays and relocated originals of dwellings depicting the life pattern of people in the states of southern India. The exhibits portray the architecture, art, folk performing-arts and craft of South Indian traditions. The amenities include a research unit, crafts bazaar, playground, an area to hold religious functions, stone workshop, and souvenir kiosks. There are craftsmen who permanently work at DakshinaChitra who demonstrate or explain how they make their wares. Besides workshops are conducted regularly for various crafts by artists who rent the community studio.

== History ==
DakshinaChitra, meaning "a picture of the south", is a heritage village where the lifestyle of South Indians is displayed based on their states, through the architecture of the region and the living conditions and habits of the people. It was founded by the Madras Craft Foundation (MCF), an NGO started in 1984, by Deborah Thiagarajan. Thiagarajan came to Madras (now Chennai) in 1970, and visited several rural villages in Tamil Nadu and Kerala. She founded MCF in 1984 with the intent of preserving the regional culture and heritage. In July 1991, the MCF received 10 acres (4.0 ha) of land for the project from the Government of Tamil Nadu on a 33-year lease. In establishing the museum, cooperation was maintained between government organizations, industry and specialists in the sphere of conservation. Contributors to the museum's creation included long-term corporate donors [Ford Foundation] and the Office of the Development Commissioner for Handicrafts .

The roots of this museum can be traced back to the open-air museums of Europe, the United States, Japan and Southeast Asia, though its closest precursor is National Handicrafts and Handlooms Museum, New Delhi. Deborah Thiagarajan was influenced by Old Sturbridge Village and Plimoth Plantation (USA) and unidentified sites in Japan and Romania. The center's emphasis on pre-industrial technology and material culture were selectively borrowed from many of the existing museums. DakshinaChitra's exhibitions are predominantly architectural as at Skansen, Greenfield Village (USA) and the Weald and Downland Museum (England). The exhibitions consist of relocated originals. Not all structures are reassembled originals, as seen at Colonial Williamsberg and Plimoth Plantation, several structures are generic replicas of vernacular styles and others are exact recreations of specific off-site structures. In addition, the exhibitions span a broad range. With its relocated originals and re-created copes, DakshinaChitra aims to represent the late-eighteenth to mid-twentieth century, framing that vaguely bounded period of intensive British colonization.

== Design ==
The museum's master plan was developed by architect Laurie Baker, free of cost, because of his interest in rural architectural design. A master plan is a small-scale graphic outline that shows all the major elements of a project. Laurie Baker, known for his unconventional approach, included the use of local materials and the adaptation of artisanal production methods suited to the environment in design. Baker began his master plan for DakhshinaChitra as a map, which in execution on site was different from the it. He planned to represent architecture of each southern state as a village with its small streets and walkways. Baker did not want to have grand buildings in the campus. He thought that ‘this place’ should deal with arts and crafts of ordinary people. He pursued his philosophy of ‘small is beautiful’. Benny Kuriakose, the architect who carried out the work later, recalls in one of his articles that Baker said; “the idea is to abandon the big exhibition pavilion system entirely. For one thing, they can’t be typical or genuine because our forebears didn’t have such things, and for another thing, folk stuff is mainly small. Blow it up and out of size, it is all wrong.”

Kuriakose, retained the main "spatial types and syntax", but altered the layout of master plan. The reason for this change was due to change in circumstances around the site location. One such example is the change of entrance from side road to the East Coast Road. When Baker prepared the master plan, the sizes and styles of the buildings which are purchased were not known. To accommodate these transplanted buildings, master plan had to be modified. Although Kuriakose's association with Baker and Thiagarajan started in 1984, with MCF, he became involved with buildings in DakshinaChitra only in the second half of 1995, with the construction of the three houses in Kerala section- Calicut house, Puthupally house and Koothattukulam house. Later, they designed the main reception center, the stores, the gallery, the restaurant, guesthouses 2 and 3, and the other minor public buildings.

== Collection ==
=== Architecture ===
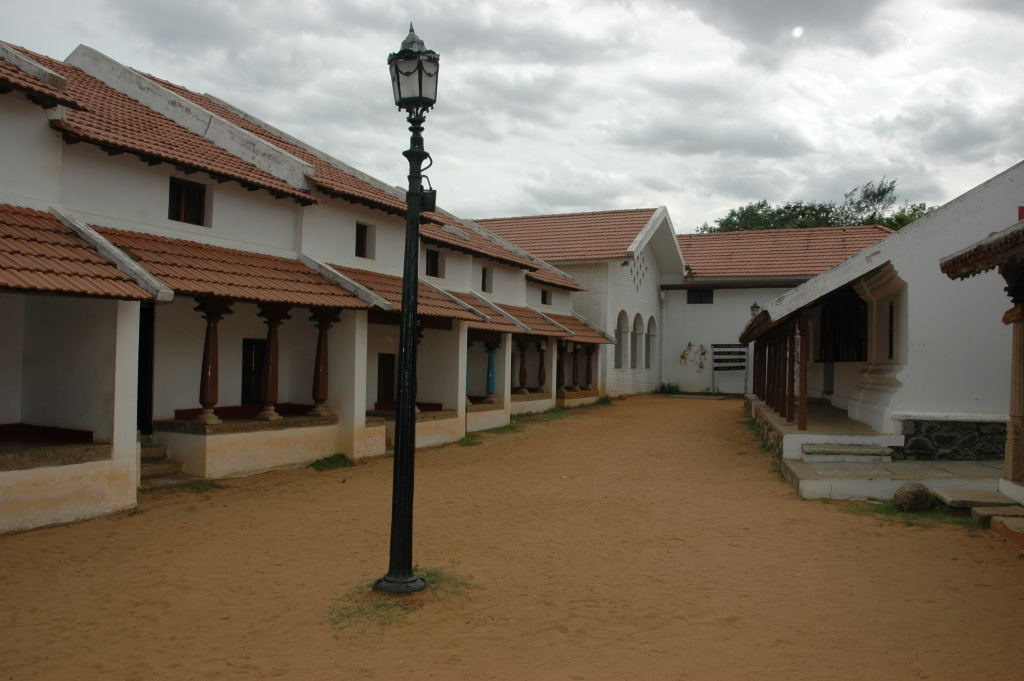
An Agraharam from Tirunelveli assembled within the museum.

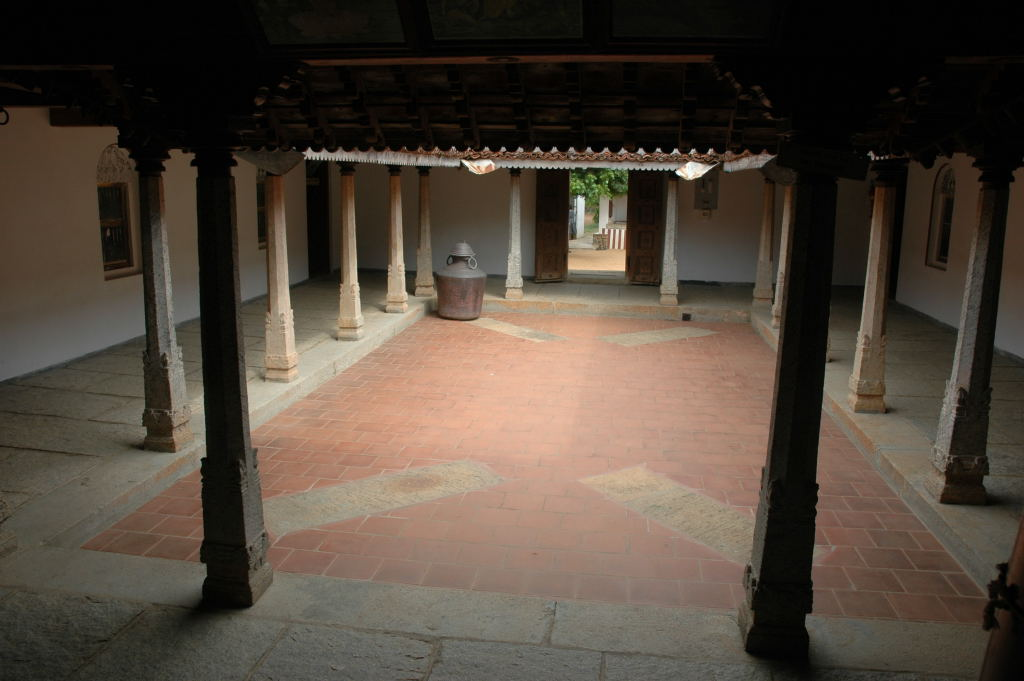
A typical Tamil house recreated in the museum.

The complex brings together old buildings that have been transplanted from other sites, to give an idea of vernacular architecture and forms of community living from southern states namely Tamil Nadu, Andhra Pradesh, Karnataka and Kerala. It has zones devoted to these four southern states. The architecture is not grandiose, and is not folk either, this is mostly urban middle class traditional architecture, which means it is a complex that eschews spectacle and grand scale, as well as ethnography.

The museum has 18 heritage houses representing the living styles of people from the states. The original houses in their "vernacular style" were purchased by MCF and were recreated by a team of masons, carpenters and architecture students. The purchase costs varied from Rs. 50,000 for ordinary mud houses to Rs. 1.5 million for the Chettinad merchants' mansions with crafted doors and woodwork. They were then dismantled systematically under the guidance of stapathis (temple architects). The dismantled elements were transported to the museum site and recreated at the allotted space in their exact original form. Apart from recreating the homes, the roads and all other features that existed in the old village sites were recreated.

State-wise Collection
Si No:	State	Type of building
1	Tamil Nadu Tamil Nadu House, DakshinaChitra	Tamil Nadu Merchant House; Brahmin House; Silk Weavers House; Agricultural House; Potters House
2	Andhra Pradesh Andhra House, DakshinaChitra	Coastal Andhra House; Ikat House
3	Karnataka Karnataka House, DakshinaChitra	The Chikamagalur House; Ilkal Weavers House
4	Kerala Kerala House, DakshinaChitra	Syrian Christian House; Calicut House; Hindu Trivandrum House; Granary

Tamil Nadu section showcases how yesteryear merchants, Brahmins, silk weavers, agriculturists and potters lived. The Ikat weavers house and coastal Andhra house are exhibited in Andhra Pradesh section. The Ilkal weavers house and a house from Chikamagalur are at display in Karnataka section. In the Kerala section, the Syrian Christian house known for its distinctive layout with the entrance leading directly to the granary, the Hindu house built largely using jackfruit wood and palmyra and the Calicut house representing homes in north Kerala are displayed.

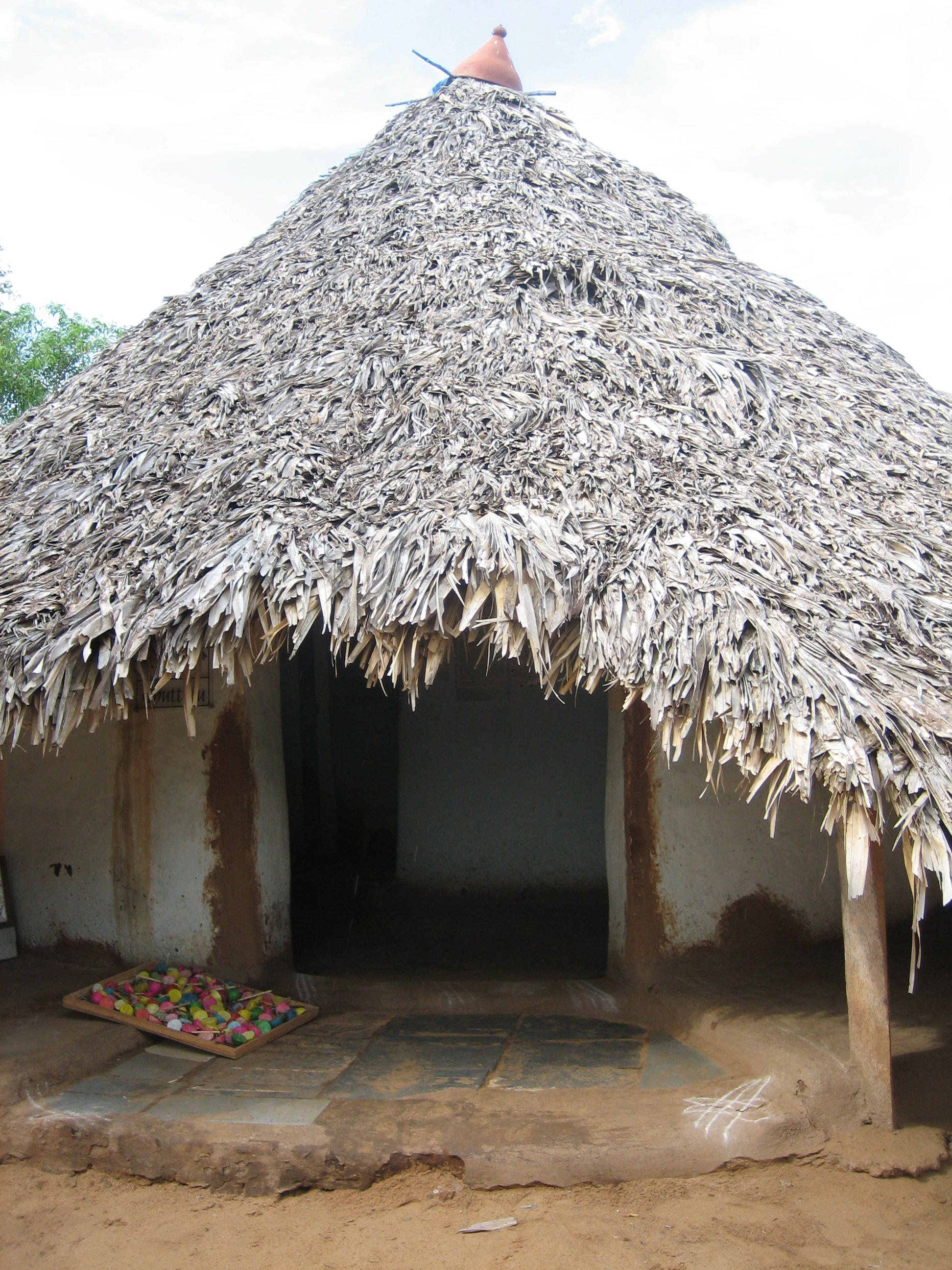
Fisherman's Andhra House on the museum grounds.

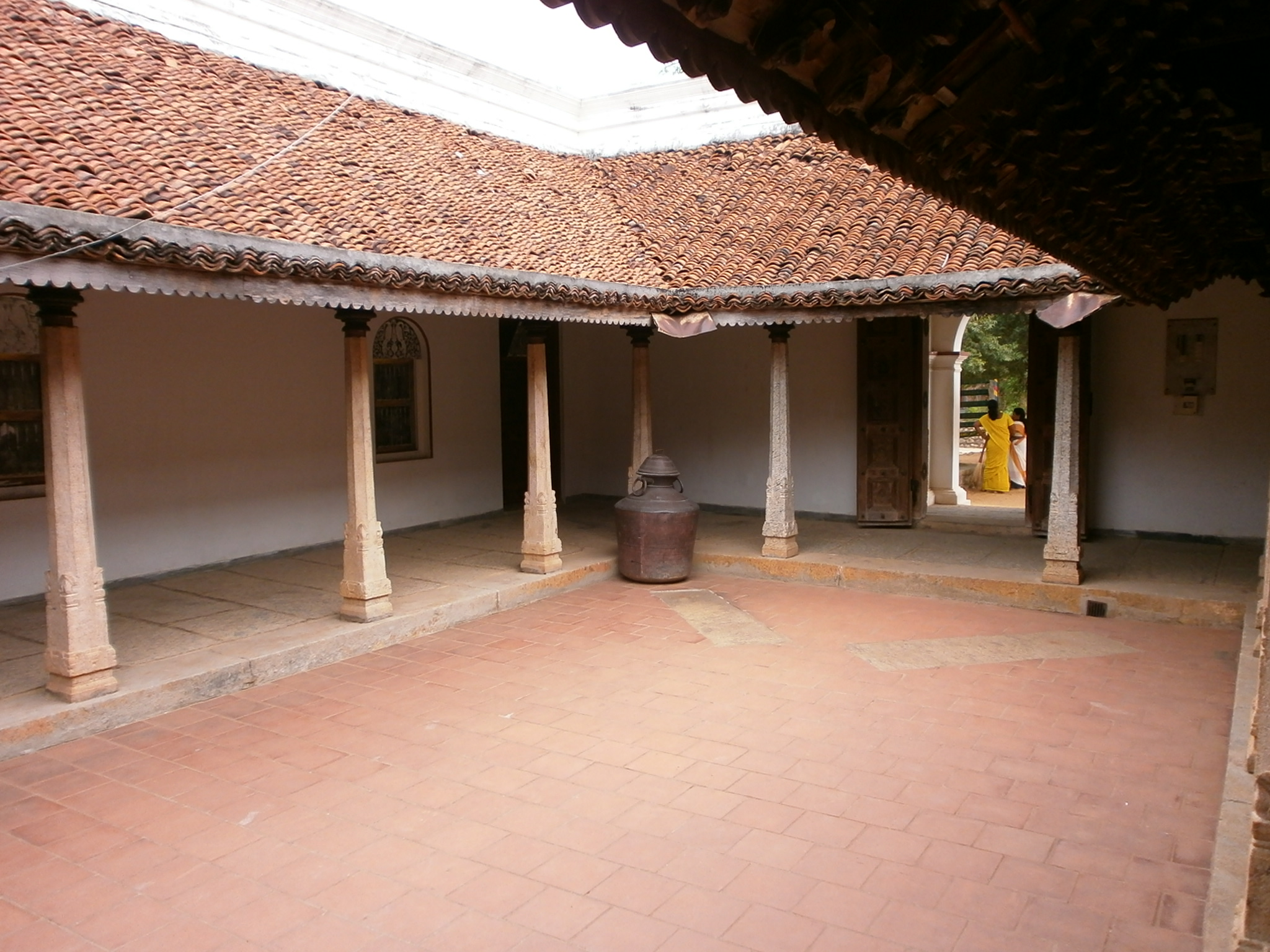
Inside a house at DakshinaChitra

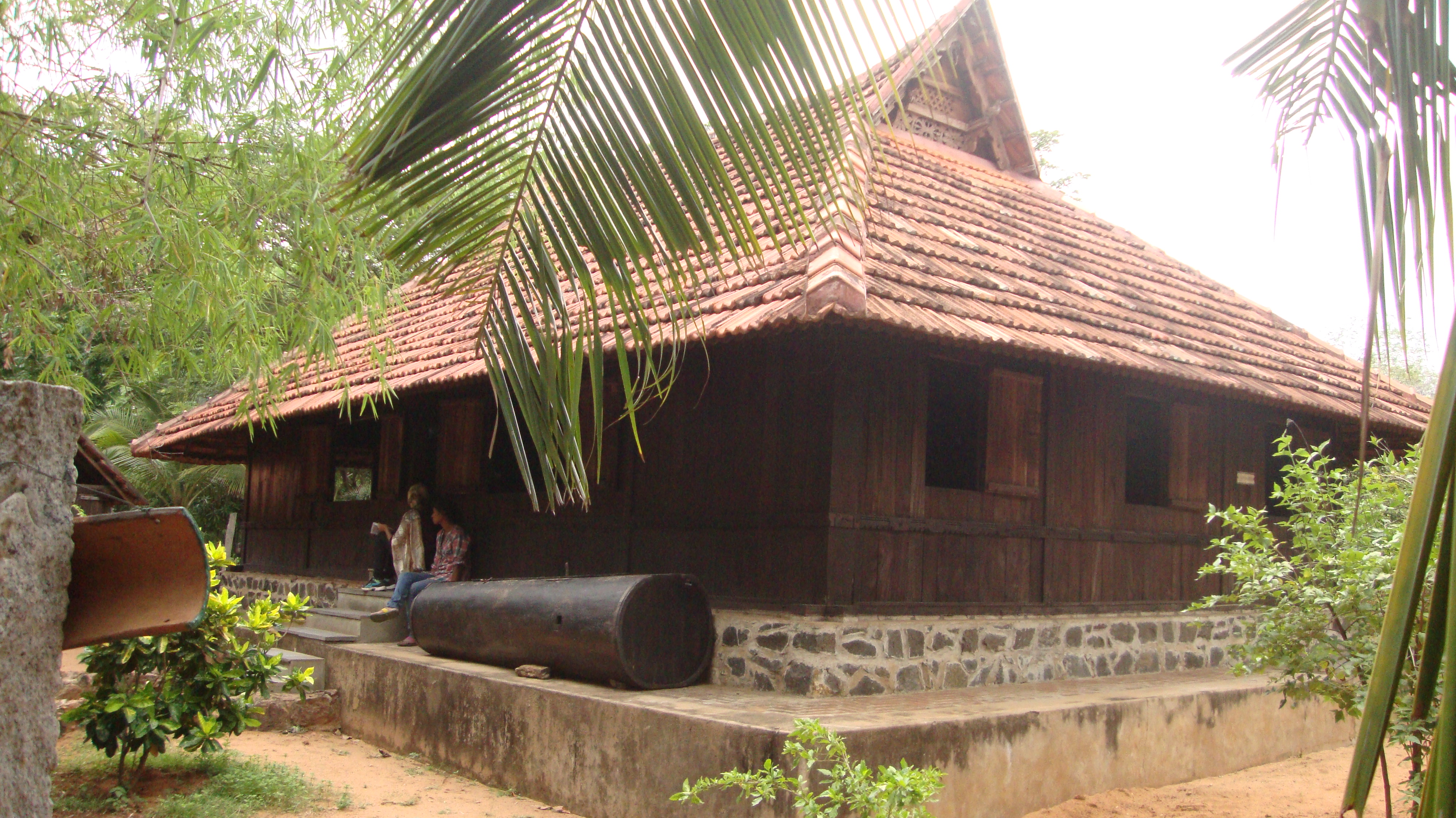
A house in DakshinaChitra

=== Artefacts ===
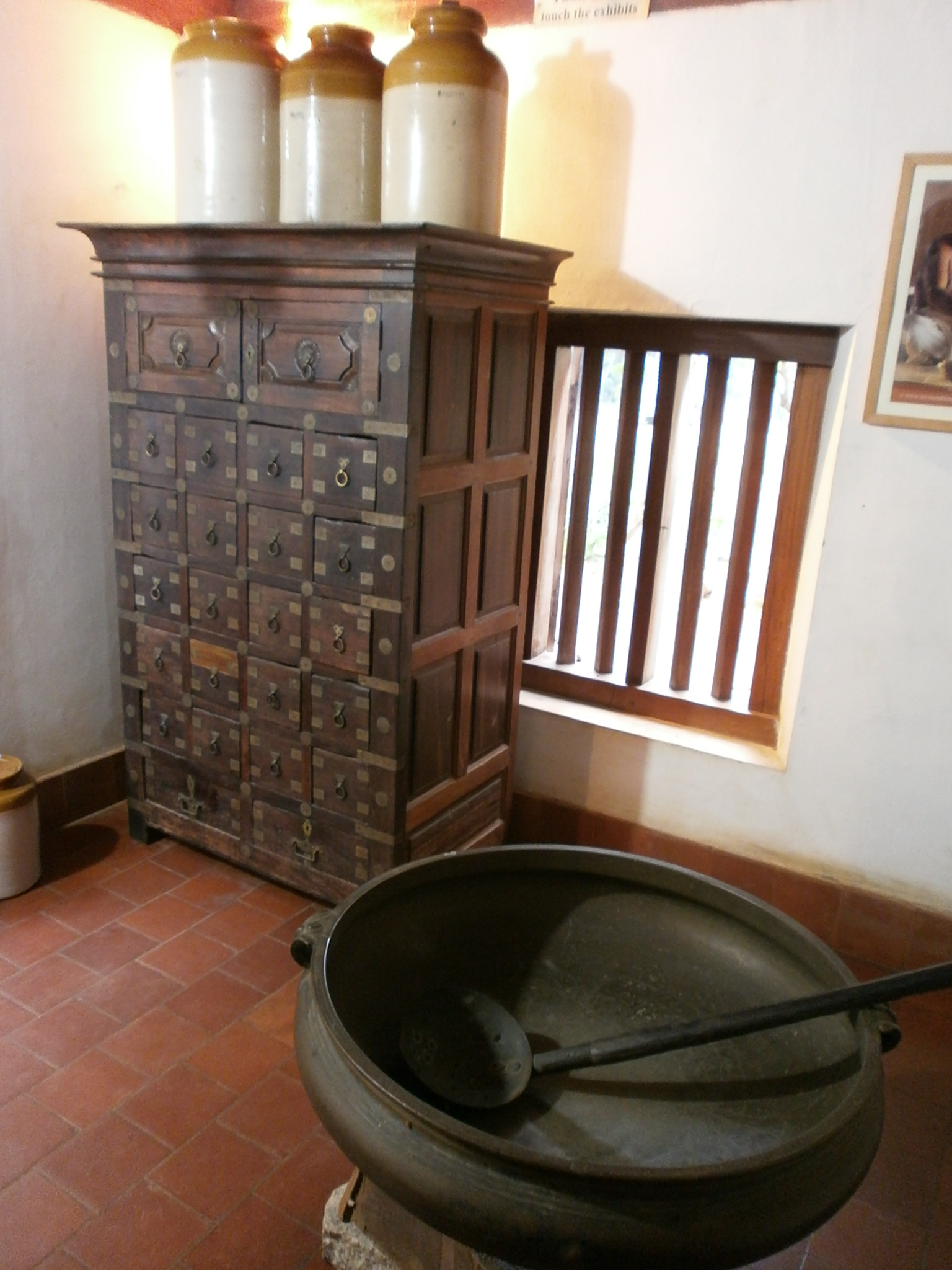
Household items within the museum's collection.

The collection consists of items of daily life used in the southern states. As of 2014, there were 4,220 artefacts on display; 3,200 are objects 950 are textiles and 70 contemporary works. The textile collection consists of cotton and silk attires of male (dhoti, lungi, kurta, turban, cap, ceremonial attire), female (saree, blouse, half saree, full skirt, set mundu, veil, scarf), furnishings, yardage (Real Madras Handkerchief, Ikat, Kalamkari etc. ), Telia Rumal, decorative wall hangings and ritual textiles. The entire display is in the English language, and highlights the cultural aspects of people and the craft traditions of heritage homes of South India.

Museum collection
Museum collection	House hold items in museum collection	Household items in museum collection	Mural in a household, DakshinaChitra	Woven mat and stand in the museum collection

== Library and Archives ==
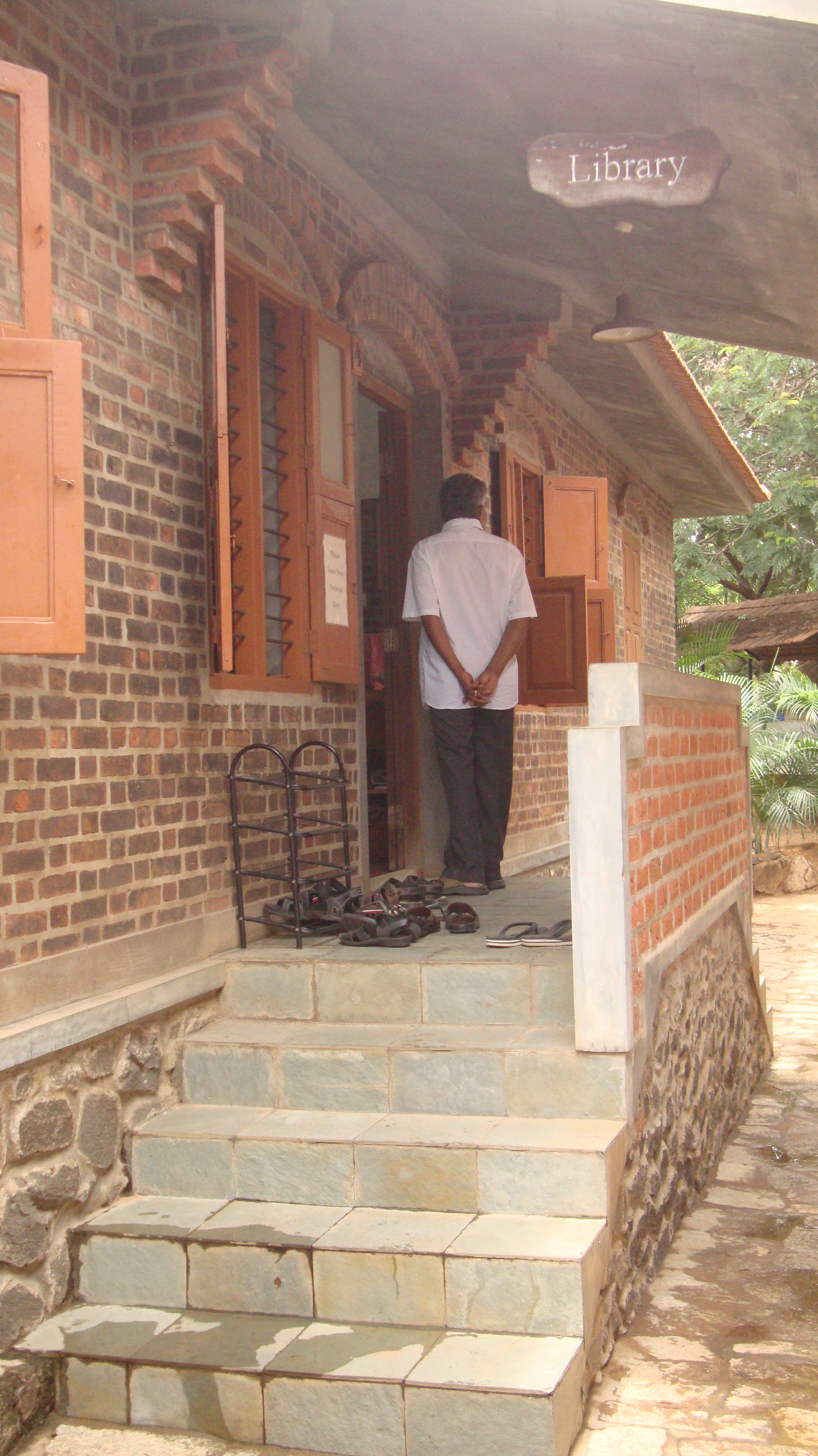
Library at DakshinaChitra

DakshinaChitra has collection of over 14,000 books and journals on South Indian arts, crafts, performance, anthropology and folklore. The Library includes the National Folklore Support Centre's collections and also houses more than 1,00,000 photographs and a vast collection of DVDs, CDs and tapes. Some of the archives are of old journal collections such as Marg, India Magazine, Lalit Kala, Sangeet Natak as well as other journal collections such as South Asian Studies, Art India etc. They also have census reports on crafts, houses, festival and out-of-print books on crafts and arts. DakshinaChitra accepts donation of books related to art, craft and culture of South India.

== Programs ==
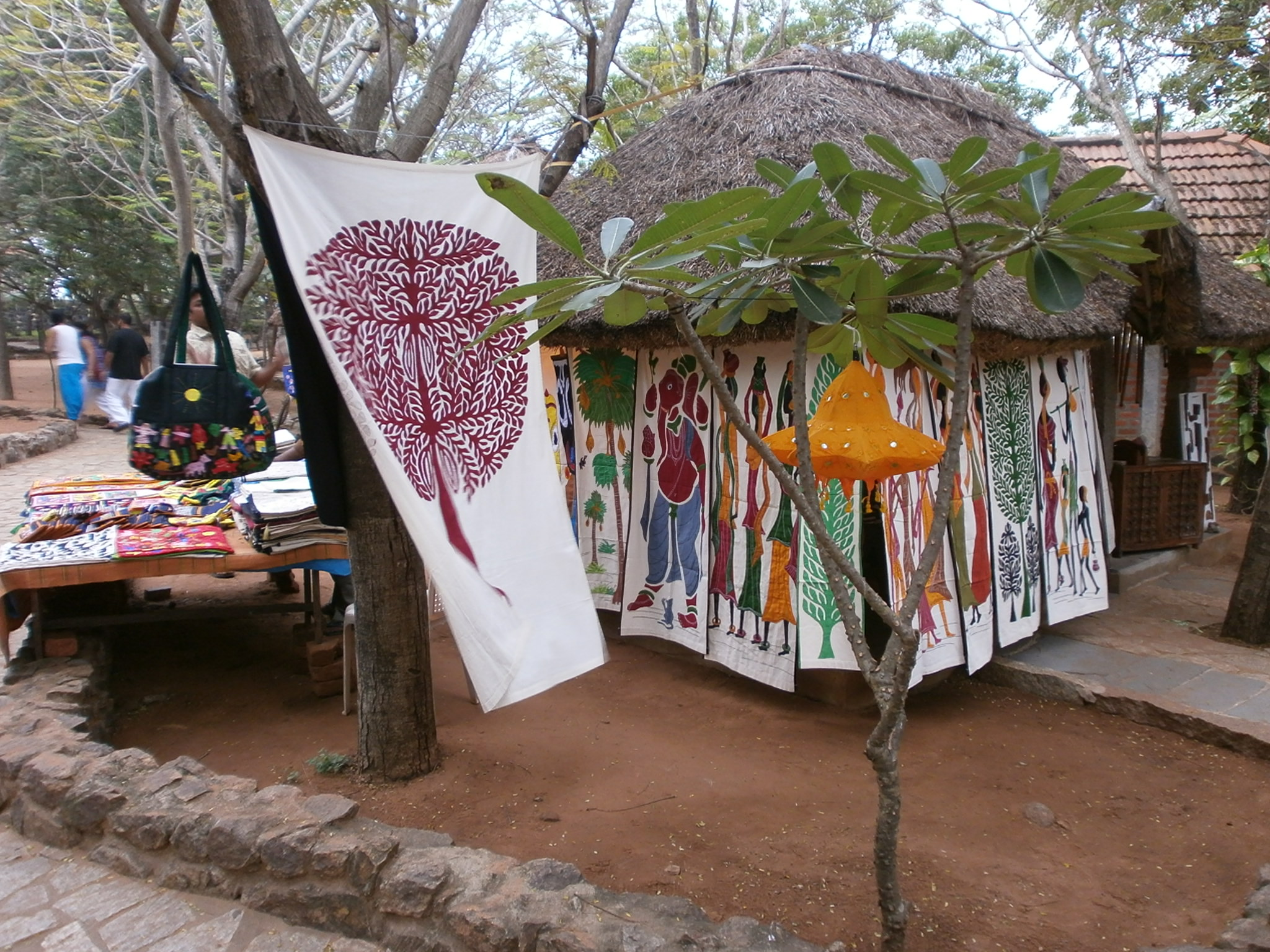
Craft items for sale at DakshinaChitra

The museum is a center for living traditions of art, folk performing arts, and crafts set up with the objective of preserving and promoting South India's heritage and culture. Special programmes feature dances, crafting of necklaces, basket weaving, and puppet shows. The museum also holds workshops for training in traditional crafts such as indigo dyeing. Potters trained at the center are issued a certificate of their skills by the regional office of the Department of the Development Commissioner (Handicrafts). Classical dances such as Bharatnatyam, Mohiniyattam and Kuchipudi, and music concerts are regular events held in the large amphitheater. Each year, 15,000 school children visit the museum.

== Criticism ==
Anthropologist and historian, Mary Hancock has written about DakshinaChitra in her book The Politics of Heritage from Madras to Chennai. She has written that the global template of DakshinaChitra has earned both praise and criticism, with some conservation architects and cultural tourism proponents describing it as a Disneyfied version of south India's past; some critics complaining that the characterization of pre-industrial village life is inaccurate, focusing too much on the Nattukkottai Chettiar, and that the site is "stamped" with "American consumerism". With its fusion of the education, entertainment and spectacle, it is a major destination marketed to the cosmopolitan audiences. It is a space offering rural southern India as representation of the country, that invites both detached contemplation and nostalgic attachment. It is also said that DakshinaChitra embodies the contradiction of mourning the loss of pre- industrial life ways, yet is premised on free-market economic practice. But the curator, Thiagarajan traces her commitment to the project to deeply felt concerns about the loss of vernacular architectural, performance and craft traditions with southern India's rapid industrialization.

== Bibliography ==
- Acuff, Joni Boyd; Evans, Laura (8 July 2014). Multiculturalism in Art Museums Today. Rowman & Littlefield Publishers. ISBN 978-0-7591-2411-0.
- Fernandez, Joseph (8 December 2004). Corporate Communications: A 21st Century Primer. SAGE Publications. ISBN 978-0-7619-9746-7.
- Guggenheim, Michael; Söderström, Ola (4 December 2009). Re-shaping Cities: How Global Mobility Transforms Architecture and Urban Form. Routledge. ISBN 978-1-135-18908-2.
- Hancock, Mary E. (29 October 2008). The Politics of Heritage from Madras to Chennai. Indiana University Press. ISBN 978-0-253-00265-5.
- Link, Rosemary J.; Ramanathan, Chathapuram S. (16 September 2010). Human Behavior in a Just World: Reaching for Common Ground. Rowman & Littlefield Publishers. ISBN 978-1-4422-0292-4.
- Madhyam (2000). Madhyam: Issues in Communication, Culture, and Development. Vol. 15, Issues 1-2. Bangalore: Madhyam.
- Programme, United Nations Human Settlements (2004). The State of the World's Cities 2004/2005: Globalization and Urban Culture. UN-HABITAT. ISBN 978-92-1-131705-3.
