= Quiricus =

Quiricus may refer to:

- Cyricus (died 304), also known as Saint Quiricus, Christian child martyr and saint
- Quiricus (bishop of Toledo) (died 680), metropolitan bishop of Toledo from about 667, possibly the same person as the bishop of Barcelona
- Quiricus (bishop of Barcelona) (died 680), bishop of Barcelona from 648 until about 667

== See also ==
- Quirico
- Cyriacus (name)
