= Cyriack =

Cyriack is a given name. Notable people with the name include:

- Cyriack Garel (born 1996), French footballer
- Cyriack Skinner (1627–1700), English writer
