= Greek Cypriot name =

Greek Cypriots may bear common Greek surnames, but there are some which are markedly Cypriot; there are some names which indicate place of birth or origin, or occupation, for example: Παφίτης (Paphitis), "from Paphos"; Καϊμακλιώτης (Kaimakliotis), "from Kaimakli"; Σκαρπάρης (Skarparis), "shoemaker"; Κωμοδρόμος (Komodromos), "smith". As most Cypriots used patronymics until independence when surnames became officially used in public registers, a similar process of creation of surnames took place to that of other Greek-speaking populations outside Greece. A good example would be Ευσταθιάδης (Efstathiades).

In keeping with older traditions of Greeks, Cypriots often have a patronym, literally, the name of the father. At the same time, the first-born son may take as a first name his paternal grandfather's name (sometimes a second-born son taking as his name the maternal grandfather's name), leading to repetition. For example, a grandfather being called Γεώργιος Αργυρού (George Argyrou), his son being named Σάββας Γεωργίου (Savvas Georgiou), and the grandson called Γεώργιος Γεωργίου (George Georgiou) or Γεώργιος Σαββίδης (George Savvidis).

Cypriot surnames may include digraphs that mark aspirated stops, e.g. Ττοφή /tʰoˈfi/.

Cypriot first names include: Γιωρκής (Yiorkis), Στυλλής (Styllis), Αλισαβού (Alisavou), Πκιερής (Pkieris). Also, there are names which are found elsewhere, but are unusual, except in Cyprus where they are more highly concentrated. Examples include: Βαρνάβας (Barnabas), Βερεγγάρια (Berengaria), Δωμέτιος (Dometios), Μάμας (Mamas), Μάριος (Marios), Νεόφυτος (Neophytos).

== See also ==
- List of Cypriots
