= Cyriack Garel =

French footballer (born 1996)

Personal information
- Date of birth: 13 July 1996 (age 30)
- Place of birth: Rennes, France
- Height: 1.80 m (5 ft 11 in)
- Position: Goalkeeper

Team information
- Current team: FC Guichen

Youth career
- Rennes

Senior career*
Years	Team	Apps	(Gls)
2014–2016	Reims B	3	(0)
2014–2016	Reims	1	(0)
2016–2018	Avranches B	28	(0)
2016–2018	Avranches	4	(0)
2018	Granville	5	(0)
2019–	FC Guichen	6	(0)
- * Club domestic league appearances and goals as of 23:29, 26 October 2019 (UTC)

Cyriack Garel (born 13 July 1996) is a French footballer who plays as a goalkeeper for Championnat National 3 club FC Guichen.

== Club career ==
Garel is a youth exponent from Stade de Reims. He made his Ligue 1 debut in a 3–0 away defeat against FC Metz on 27 September 2014.
