= Jomon Kuriakose =

Indian-British chef

Chef Jomon
- Born: Jomon Kuriakose; Mavelikkara, Kerala, India
- Education: SIHA -Sarosh Institute of Hotel Administration, Mangalore, Karnataka, India
- Culinary career
- Cooking style: Indian / Pan Indian / Asian cuisine

Jomon Kuriakose, also known as Chef Jomon, is the founder and head chef Kerala restaurant in Honchurch, Essex, called Chef Jomon's #Veedu. He was previously the Executive Chef at LaLiT London, England making him one of the youngest executive chefs in London. and before that Chef de Cusine at LaLiT London. He has also participated in MasterChef (British TV series) 2018 where he trained Spencer Matthews and Frankie Bridge.

He was a competitor on the National Chef of the Year, 2021 and also writes regularly for Malayala Manorama Online.

== Early life and education ==
Born and raised in Mavelikkara, Kerala, India, Jomon completed a bachelor's degree in Hotel Management from Sarosh Institute of Hotel Administration under Mangalore University. After graduation, Jomon joined Speciality Restaurant Pvt Ltd and later in 2008, he moved to London and took up the role of Chef de Partie and then Sous-chef under Vivek Singh (chef) at the Cinnamon Collections in London. He joined Baluchi at the Lalit London as Chef de Cuisine in 2017. He worked from 2024 to 2026 as the Director of Culinary at The Tiffin Box a chain of international restaurants. He specialised in authentic Indian cuisine and developed his skills in fine Anglo-Indian dining

Awards and recognition

- He was recognised as a culinary hero (2021) by the Craft Guild of Chefs
- 100 most influential Malayalis in the UK
- The news person of the year 2019, British Malayali
