= Mitraniketan =

- Type: Non Governmental Organization
- Established: 1956
- Director: K. Viswanathan
- Website: http://www.mitraniketan.org/

Mitraniketan Vishwavidyapeetam for Open Learning & Total Development is a Non-Governmental organization located at Vellanad, which is 25 km away from Thiruvananthapuram, the capital of Kerala state in South India. It is a 500-member community, including a staff of 100 men and women. Mitraniketan works in the fields of innovation, training and extension in community development, environment, science, education and appropriate technology. The project was begun with a view to offering education and training in a holistic spirit to primarily socially underprivileged children and youngsters. The organization focuses on alternative education mode for development.

== History ==
Mitraniketan was founded by Padmashri K.Viswanathan in 1956 in his native village. He graduated from Visva Bharati University, Santiniketan (W.B.), studied educational development in USA and Scandinavia, and in the process was inspired to launch the Mitraniketan project, "The Home of Friends", in Sanskrit the word 'Mitra' means Friends 'Niketan' means Home. In 1950s Vellanad was a remote village and there was only one government institution at Vellanad that was Government High School. He started his work by providing supplementary education for the students of nearby schools after school hours. Those class were very informal since he aimed for a total development in children. As it became a huge success he converted it into a Malayalam medium school. Now it known as the Mitraniketan Vikas Bhavan School (Primary & Secondary). The greatest challenge he faced at that time was the scarcity of students for a regular schooling. Parents of neighboring children were not ready to send their children for an experiment. But Viswanathan was not ready to lose faith, he moved to some of the northern districts of Kerala where there are huge number of tribal population. He met them, talked with them, stayed with them.. at last they came forward to send their children with him. Mitraniketan Vikasbhavan school is not a regular school, it aims to develop active citizenship among the students by developing their innate potentials.

== Location ==
Main campus of Mitraniketan is situated near Vellanad, Thiruvananthapuram district, state of Kerala, South India.

City Center a liaison office, situated at West Fort near Thiruvananthapuram City, Kerala.

Education Extension Center situated at Wayanad district of Kerala State.

== About Mitraniketan ==
Mitraniketan is a 500-member community, including a staff of about 100 men and women. It operates on a 60-acre campus in architecturally untraditional buildings with classrooms dotted around in a hilly green palm forest. There is a children's hostel, a students' college and hostel, a gym and sports field, a guest house, vocational training workshops, small art and grocery shops, a small but exquisite bakery, a pottery, offices etc. Architecturally noteworthy are especially the open assembly hall and the modest but beautiful home of Viswanathan and his wife, Sethu Viswanathan, at the centre of the settlement.

=== About Founder ===
Padmashri K.Viswanathan (b. 1928, d. April 28, 2014) graduated from Visva-Bharati University, Santiniketan (W.B.), studied educational development in United States and Scandinavia, and in the process was inspired to launch the Mitraniketan project, "The Home of Friends" in 1956. His endeavours over these more than 50 years have established the place as an internationally reputed institution for learning and development.

== Activities ==
=== Development Education Programmes ===
This largely residential educational community supports the academic and practical training needs of Socio-economically backward groups. All programs involve integrated education aimed at the total development of each participant.

- Nursery and Kindergarten called Sisu Bhavan: for 30-50 neighbourhood children from 2½ to 5 years old. They are provided with a midday meal and transportation at a reasonable cost, and their programme is based on the concept that “play is children’s work”.
- Primary and Secondary Schools called Vikas Bhavan: (standards 1 through 10, similar to Canadian or American Grades 1 through 10) for 250 to 300 children mostly tribals from 5 to 15 years old. Headmistress Sethu Viswanathan leads a staff of 20 teachers and 5 craft instructors. School is recognized by the government ensuring that students can undertake further education in the mainstream programmes. The school practice an integrated education which makes this school different from ordinary schools. Mitraniketan school depends mostly on contributions from well-wishers.
- Mitraniketan People's College (MPC): It aims to provide opportunities for continuing education and impart the spirit of Life Long Learning for empowering rural youth. The MPC was started in the year 1996. So far about one thousand youth imbibed the essence of this institution. The MPC is modelled on the gurukula system of education and the Danish folk high schools. The Danish government aid programme funded the buildings and initial programmes of MPC, as well as several conferences on different aspects of non-formal education.
- Open University (IGNOU) Study Center: Two courses, Motorcycle Service & Repair and Fruits & Vegetable-based products were inaugurated in 2007 through the Indira Gandhi National Open University.
- Study Center for NIOS (National Institute of Open Schooling) Certification: These programs bridge 9th Standard, Secondary and Senior Secondary exams. Vocational classes for Secondary students include: Computer studies, Plumbing, Electrical, Carpentry and Agricultural skills.
- Women's Empowerment / Extension Programs: Supports different Women's groups over the years, from micro-credit to soap-making; from civic matters to health and nutrition training. Mitraniketan Nodal Continuing Education Centre of the Kerala State Literacy Mission (or KSLM) promotes equivalency education among women. Although Kerala has a very high literacy rate, many rural women still need basic reading and writing skills. They can be KSLM-certified, which promotes functional literacy.
- Education Extension Center: The extension center located in the tribal dominated district of Wayanad District of Kerala focuses on the empowerment of tribal youth, especially women.
- Center for Education, Research, Innovation and Development (CERID): Aims at coordinating the education programmes, conducting action research studies, developing teaching materials and engaging in documentation & publication.

=== Krishi Vigyan Kendra (Farm Science Center) ===
Mitraniketan KVK is an institutional project funded by Indian Council of Agricultural Research (ICAR), New Delhi established in 1979 at Mitraniketan to work on transfer of technology with the objective to bridge the gap between technology and farmer.

KVK works on the mandates of...

- Conduct "On -farm testing" for identifying in terms of location specific sustainable land use system.
- Organize training to update the extension personnel with emerging advances in agricultural research on regular basis.
- Organize short and long term vocational training courses in agriculture and allied vocations for the farmers and rural youth with emphasis on "learning by doing" for higher production on farms and generating self-employment.
- Organise front line demonstrations on various crops to generate production data and feed back information.

==== Sections of Mitraniketan KVK ====
The KVK has six important sections to cater the needs of the farmers and other associated stakeholders who use land and water for their livelihood. A Training Associate heads each of the section with the duties of Technology transfer, refinement and training. Field days, campaigns and other extension activities are performed under the head of technology transfer on the concrete technologies of the National Agricultural Research System (NARS). Under the refinement mandate the sections perform the Front line Demonstrations (FLD) and On Farm Trails (OFT) are conducted. The sections under the KVK are:

1. Agronomy : This section deals with technology transfer, refinement and training on the advanced crop production technologies with the main goals of raising the production and productivity of different commercial crops. Agronomy section of the KVK at present is taking the charge of disseminating advanced crop production techniques in the new crop introduced in Kerala Vanilla and other cash crops. The different training programmes under the agronomy section are as follows. Interested candidates can write to the Training Programmes Recycling of farm waste Organic farming Apiculture Vanilla cultivation Intercropping in coconut Homestead farming Plant nursery management Scientific Rubber tapping.

2. Agricultural Engineering : The Agricultural Engineering section of the KVK is responsible towards the technology transfer, refinement and training activities for farmers and other target groups in effective utilization of the farm equipments and machineries. The section has developed a low cost paddy winnower and has been popularized in various parts of Kerala. Similarly the section has contributed to a greater extent in disseminating the bio gas technology and smokeless Chulah to various target groups of the district. The training programmes conducted under the section are Production of biogas from organic waste Rainwater harvesting using ferrocement tanks Maintenance of smokeless chulah Improved smokeless chulah Solar equipments Drudgery reducing farm implements.

3. Agricultural Extension : This division carries out trainings for extension functionaries. The division trains different target groups on the sociological aspects of farming. The impact studies of the KVK activities, generation of reports, production of publications, documentation, coordinating the recreational activities of KVK, popularization of certain extension approaches and successful technologies of the KVK by this discipline. The quarterly newsletter and website of the KVK is administered by this division. The training programmes under the discipline are

  - Group Dynamics and Leadership
  - Planning and implementation of NGOs
  - Project preparation, implementation and evaluation

4. Animal science : This division carries out:

  - Training: Conduct regular training on dairy management, artificial insemination, goatery, piggery, rabbitry, poultry keeping and fodder cultivation.
  - Co-ordinates the activities of 33 Rural Extension Sub Centres: Mitraniketan KVK has introduced a novel idea of two-step extension approach for reaching to the masses. The trained artificial insemination technicians of Mitraniketan KVK function as the extension agency in villages.
  - Breeding programme: Pedigree bulls and bucks are kept in the animal science section and semen is collected from these animals twice in a week. The technicians of artificial insemination (AI) centers conduct AI in the villages for improving the animal germplasm.
  - Conservation of native animals: Mitraniketan KVK has undertaken the social responsibility in conserving natural animal germplasm. The native cattle collected mostly from tribal villages of Western Ghat region is conserved in the dairy unit of the KVK. Evaluations of the performance of these animals are progressing.
  - Poultry unit: Backyard poultry, Turkey, Goose and Guinea fowls are available in the poultry unit and regular training programmes are arranged on their management practices.
  - Fodder unit: Hybrid napier and guinea grass are planted in the fodder unit. Saplings are available for farmers from this division.
  - Azolla Unit: Technical guidance is available on the construction of low cost azolla units and the seeds are available.
  - Biogas based power generation unit: The animal waste of the unit has been used effectively for power generation. This serves as a demonstration unit.
  - Technical guidance: Technical guidance is provided in livestock, farm management and entrepreneurships in animal husbandry.
  - Animal care: Veterinary care is available through the Rural Extension Sub Centres during the visit of Training Associate (Animal Science) of the KVK on prescheduled dates. Also a fully equipped veterinary clinic is functioning in the animal science division of the KVK.

5. Horticulture : The Horticulture division of the KVK deals with the advanced and low cost technology dissemination of fruits, vegetables and flowers. The KVK has a Tissue Culture (TC) lab producing TC banana, orchids and anthuriums. A four-month vocational training programme on aspects of plant propagation and nursery management is conducted for the benefit of the rural youth, farm women, tribals etc., A lab that produces quality mushroom spawn is fully functioning to meet the needs of the mushroom growers. Quality-planting materials of fruit trees and vegetable seeds are produced from the farm maintained by this division. The training programmes under the division are:

  - Plant nursery management and landscaping
  - Mushroom culture and spawn production
  - Commercial floriculture
  - Vegetable cultivation
  - Terrace gardening
  - Tissue culture and plant propagation
  - Scientific banana cultivation
  - Medicinal plant cultivation

6. Home science:The Home science division of the KVK deals with the post harvest technology for the fruits and vegetables. This division coordinates the women cell activities of the KVK. This section deals all women oriented programmes of the KVK with the aim of economic empowerment. The different training programmes conducted under the division are:

  - Post harvest technology of fruits and vegetables
  - Low cost energy saving devices
  - Floral arrangement and handicrafts
  - Value added milk products
  - Value added coconut products
  - Value added mushroom and tuber products
  - Income generation activities in agriculture
  - Tailoring and embroidery

7. Fisheries: UK government's Department for International Development (DFID) is funding a project on Enabling Better Management of Fisheries Conflicts, which is coordinated by this division. The training on the subjects of inland fish farming and ornamental fish culture is catered for the practicing fish farmers, rural youth and extension functionaries. The skill-oriented demonstration for the ornamental fish culture is provided with the ornamental fish culture tanks maintained at the KVK with different ornamental fishes. The division is serving as a center for social science research in fisheries. The division has a linkage with several NGOs and GOs working for fisheries development.

=== Rural Technology Center (RTC) ===
This center is a Production and Training center aimed at upgrading the livelihood skills of rural artisans and youth in the non-farm sector. This includes Pottery, Carpentry, Forging and coir fibre product manufacturing.

Research and Development in Appropriate Technology

Research, development and technology transfer programs concentrate on water & sanitation, low-cost construction technology, development of artisan tools and machinery and natural dye. Mitraniketan has a Core-Support group of the Department of Science and Technology (DST), and the Technology Resource Center of CAPART.

== Mitraniketan Experimentarium for Energy-efficient Technologies (MEET) ==
Mitraniketan Experimentarium for Energy-efficient Technologies (MEET in short) is an upcoming project of Mitraniketan. It is a hands-on science & technology museum with learning games for students focusing on the field of energy conservation, energy efficiency and sustainable energy. It was started as a part of Eco-community Project of Mitraniketan, funded by CISU, Denmark.
