= Dan Singh Bisht =

Indian philanthropist

Thakur Dan Singh Bisht
- Born: 1906; Pithoragarh district
- Died: 1964 (aged 57–58)
- Occupation: Philanthropist
- Known for: Philanthropy, education, timber industry
- Notable work: DSB Campus College, Berinag tea
- Relatives: Narendra Singh Bisht (nephew) Mohan Singh Bisht (brother)

Thakur Dan Singh Bisht (1906 – 1964) was a timber industrialist and philanthropist from Kumaon, Uttarakhand, India.At his peak, he had numerous attendants, offices, and bungalows extending across much of modern day Pakistan, India, and Nepal.

He established & furthered his father's company, D.S. Bisht and Sons, which was formed by Dev Singh Bisht and his sons, Dan Singh Bisht and Mohan Singh Bisht. At the company's peak, it employed over 5,000 people and handled business worth millions of rupees.

Dan Singh Bisht established his fortune developing and selling the distinctive Berinag Tea, which he grew in large tea estates of Berinag and Chaukori.

The Bisht Industrial Corporation Ltd. was formed in 1936 to set up a sugar factory at Kichha, was aimed at supporting sugarcane cultivators in Nainital. The company came under stress post-independence & he had to sell the industrial plant, he had set up at a discount, as the government had blocked the export of machinery from Calcutta Port despite earlier authorization and financial support.

Thereafter, Dan Singh Bisht sold his shares in 1963 and died in 1964. The government took ownership of it in 1970, under the Bisht Industrial Corporation Limited (Acquisition of Undertaking) Act, 1971.
