= Rena Kyriakou =

Greek pianist and composer

Rena Kyriakou (25 February 1917 – August 1994) was a pianist and composer born in Herakleion, Crete, Greece.

== Education ==
Rena Kyriakou revealed an early aptitude for the piano and for composition, and gave her first public performance at the age of six in Athens, performing twelve original piano pieces. She studied first in Vienna under Paul Weingarten and Richard Stöhr and then in Paris under Henri Büsser and Isidor Philipp. At the age of sixteen, she was awarded the first prize for piano at the Conservatoire National de Paris.

== Career ==
Kyriakou followed a dual career as pianist and composer. Her recorded legacy includes the complete piano music of Emmanuel Chabrier, whose works she played with idiomatic flair, and recitals of works by John Field, Joseph Haydn, Enrique Granados and Isaac Albéniz. She recorded a major survey of the piano music of Felix Mendelssohn. Her sound, both in recordings and in concert, was characterised by a wide palette of tone colour, as might be expected of a Philipp pupil. Some of the characteristic tone colour of her recordings is due to her use of a Bösendorfer Imperial Concert grand piano for at least some of them, including her Mendelssohn recordings.

== Death ==
She died in August 1994 in Athens.

== Works ==
Her compositions include a piano concerto as well as solo piano pieces. Some of the more representative ones are the following:

- 6 Preludes symphoniques, Op. 8
- Les Cloches and Burlesque, Op. 9
- 6 Preludes lyriques, Op.12
- 5 Preludes, Op. 13
- Phantaisie, Op. 14
- Perpetuum mobile, Op. 15
- Deux pieces pour piano, Op. 16
- Theme et Variations, Op.17.
