= James Brown (disambiguation) =

James Brown (1933–2006) was an American recording artist and musician.

James, Jim, or Jimmy Brown may also refer to:

== Authors, editors, and publishers ==
- J. B. Selkirk (1832–1904), Scottish poet and essayist, born James Brown
- James Brown (author) (born 1957), American novelist and memoirist
- James Brown (editor) (born 1965), English editor and media entrepreneur
- James Brown (publisher) (1800–1855), American publisher and co-founder of Little, Brown and Company
- James Cooke Brown (1921–2000), American sociologist and science fiction author
- James Brown (Isle of Man) (1815–1881), British publisher of The Isle of Man Times

== Clergymen ==
- James Brown (moderator) (1724–1786), moderator of the Church of Scotland in 1777
- James Brown (academic) (1709–1784), English clergyman and academic
- James Brown (archdeacon of Perth) (1820–1895), Canadian Anglican priest
- James Brown (bishop of Louisiana) (born 1932), American Episcopal bishop
- James Brown (bishop of Shrewsbury) (1812–1881), English Roman Catholic bishop
- James Brown (dean of Edmonton) (fl. 1959–1981), Canadian Anglican priest
- James Brown (Scottish clergyman) (1734–1791), clergyman in the Scottish Episcopal Church
- James Baldwin Brown (1820–1884), British Congregational minister
- James Mellor Brown (1796–1867), British cleric and scriptural geologist

== Film, radio, and television personnel ==
- J. Anthony Brown (born 1945), American comedian and actor
- James Brown (actor) (1920–1992), American actor
- James Harmon Brown, American television writer with Barbara Esensten
- Jim Brown (1936–2023), American former football player and actor
- Jim Brown (director) (born 1950), American film director
- Jim Brown (radio host), host of the Calgary Eyeopener
- James Hall (actor) (James E. Brown, 1900–1940), American actor
- James S. Brown Jr. (1892–1949), American cinematographer
- James Brown (sportscaster)

== Military personnel ==
- James Brown (sailor) (1826–1905), American sailor who fought in the American Civil War
- James E. Brown III (born 1954), US Air Force officer and test pilot
- James R. Brown (1930–2015), general in the US Air Force
- James Sutherland Brown (1881–1951), Canadian general and war planner
- James Brown (Medal of Honor) (1847–?), US Army sergeant

== Musicians ==
- James Brown (Elvis impersonator) (born 1968), Belfast-born Elvis impersonator
- James Adrian Brown (born 1984), English musician/composer
- James Clifford Brown (1923–2004), English composer
- James Conway Brown (1838–1908), Welsh musician
- James Francis Brown (born 1969), British composer
- Jim Ed Brown (1934–2015), American country music singer
- Jimmy Brown (musician) (1926–2006), American trumpeter, saxophonist, and singer

== Politicians ==
=== Australia ===
- James Drysdale Brown (1850–1922), member of the Victorian Legislative Council
- Jim Brown (New South Wales politician) (1918–1999), member of the New South Wales Legislative Assembly
- Jim Brown (Western Australian politician) (1927–2020), member of the WA Legislative Council and Legislative Assembly

=== Canada ===
- James Brown (Canadian politician) (1828–1897), Ontario businessman and politician
- James Brown (New Brunswick politician) (1790–1870), member of the Legislative Assembly of New Brunswick between 1830 and 1861
- James C. Brown (Ontario politician) (1868–1937), Ontario farmer and political figure
- James Elisha Brown (1913–1974), member of the Canadian House of Commons from 1953 to 1957 and 1962 to 1971
- James Pollock Brown (1841–1913), Canadian politician
- James Thomas Brown (1871–1957), lawyer, judge and political figure in Saskatchewan
- Jim Brown (Ontario politician) (1943–2020), member of the Legislative Assembly of Ontario from 1995 to 1999

=== New Zealand ===
- James Clark Brown (1830–1891), MP in 1870 and 1871–1890

=== United Kingdom and Isle of Man ===
- James Brown (MP for Malton) (1814–1877), British Liberal Party politician
- James Brown (Northern Ireland politician) (1897–?), MP for South Down, Northern Ireland
- James Brown (Scottish politician) (1862–1939), MP for Ayrshire, Scotland
- James Clifton Brown (1841–1917), member of Parliament of the UK for Horsham, 1876–1880
- James Gordon Brown (born 1951), Prime Minister of the UK, 2007–2010
- Tony Brown (Manx politician) (James Anthony Brown, born 1950), Chief Minister of the Isle of Man

=== United States ===
- James Brown (Connecticut politician) (1682–1769), member of the Connecticut House of Representatives from Norwalk
- James Brown (Louisiana politician) (1766–1835), U.S. senator from Louisiana, 1813–1817 and 1819–1823
- James Brown (Montana politician) (born 1970/1971), elected as Montana State Auditor in 2024
- James Brown (South Dakota judge) (c. 1864–1936), Justice of the South Dakota Supreme Cour
- James C. Brown (Pennsylvania politician) (1828–1892), member of the Pennsylvania Senate, and of the Pennsylvania House of Representatives
- James Harvey Brown (1906–1995), city council member in Los Angeles, California
- James M. Brown (attorney) (1941–2023), attorney general of Oregon from 1980 to 1981
- James N. Brown (Illinois politician), 19th century state representative from Illinois
- James S. Brown (1824–1878), mayor of Milwaukee, Wisconsin in 1861 and member of U.S. House of Representatives, 1863–1865
- James Stephens Brown (1858–1946), mayor of Nashville, Tennessee
- James W. Brown (1844–1909), member of the U.S. House of Representatives from Pennsylvania, 1903–1905
- Jim Brown (interpreter) (born 1953), State Department language interpreter
- Jim N. Brown (1926–1991), Michigan politician

== Sportspeople ==
=== American football players and coaches ===
- James Brown (American football guard) (born 1988), American professional football player for the Chicago Bears
- James Brown (offensive tackle) (born 1970), American professional football player from 1993 to 2000
- James Brown (quarterback) (born 1975), American college football player for the University of Texas
- James A. Brown (1900–1965), American football and basketball coach
- James M. Brown (coach) (1892–1965), American college football, basketball, and baseball coach
- Jim Brown (1936–2023), American former football player and actor

=== Association football ===
- Jimmy Brown (footballer, born 1862) (1862–1922), English footballer born in Blackburn, Lancashire
- Jimmy Brown (footballer, born 1869) (1869–1924), Scottish footballer born in Bonhill, West Dunbartonshire
- James Brown (1890s footballer), Scottish football defender
- Jim Brown (Cowdenbeath footballer) (died 1955), Scottish footballer born in West Calder, West Lothian
- James Brown (footballer, born 1902) (1902–1965), English football goalkeeper born in Barnard Castle, County Durham
- James Brown (footballer, born 1906) (1906–?), Scottish footballer born in Leith, Edinburgh
- Jim Brown (soccer, born 1908) (1908–1994), Scottish-American soccer player born in Kilmarnock, East Ayrshire
- James Brown (footballer, born 1919) (1919–2005), Scottish footballer born in Glasgow
- Jimmy Brown (footballer, born 1924) (1924–2002), Scottish footballer born in Cumnock, East Ayrshire
- Jimmy Brown (footballer, born 1925) (1925–2008), Scottish goalkeeper born in Buckhaven, Fife
- Jim Brown (footballer, born 1935) (1935-), English footballer; see List of Rochdale A.F.C. players (25–99 appearances)
- Jim Brown (footballer, born 1939) (1939–2015), Scottish footballer born in Stirling
- Jim Brown (footballer, born 1950), Scottish footballer born in Edinburgh
- Jim Brown (footballer, born 1952), Scottish goalkeeper born in Coatbridge, North Lanarkshire
- Jimmy Brown (footballer, born 1953), Scottish footballer born in Bothwell, South Lanarkshire
- James Brown (footballer, born 1987), English footballer born in Cramlington, Northumberland
- James Brown (Australian soccer) (born 1990), Australian soccer player
- James Brown (footballer, born January 1998), English-Maltese footballer
- James Brown (footballer, born June 1998), Irish footballer
- Jimmy Brown (football manager), Scottish football manager

=== Baseball players ===
- Jim Brown (catcher) (1892–1943), American baseball catcher and first baseman
- Jim Brown (outfielder) (1897–1944)
- Jim Brown (pitcher) (1860–1908), baseball pitcher in 1884 and 1886
- Jimmy Brown (baseball) (1910–1977), American baseball player
- James Brown (baseball) (1919–?), American baseball player

=== Other sportspeople ===
- James Brown (BMX rider) (born 1989), Canadian BMX rider
- James Brown (bowls player), Scottish lawn bowls player
- James Brown (cricketer) (1931–2014), Scottish cricketer
- James Brown (cyclist) (born 1964), Northern Ireland cyclist
- James Brown (rugby league) (born 1988), English rugby league footballer
- James Brown (sportscaster) (born 1951), American sportscaster formerly for Fox and presently for CBS and Showtime
- James Victor Brown (1935–2020), Australian rugby player
- Jim Brown (basketball) (1912–1991), American professional basketball player
- Jim Brown (darts player) (born 1971), Scottish darts player
- Jim Brown (ice hockey) (born 1960), retired American professional ice hockey defenseman
- Jim Brown (sprinter) (1909–2000), Canadian sprinter
- Jim J. Brown (1925–1995), Australian rules footballer for Geelong
- Jim W. Brown (1926–2014), Australian rules footballer for Fitzroy
- Jimmy Brown (cricketer) (1864–1916), cricketer
- Jimmy Brown (tennis) (born 1965), retired American professional tennis player
- Jimmy White (aka Jimmy Brown, born 1962), snooker player

== Other people ==
- James Brown (artist) (1951–2020), American painter active in Paris
- James Brown (Australian pastoralist) (1819–1890), South Australian philanthropist
- James Brown (Chickasaw) (died 1839), American soldier
- James Brown (ecologist) (born 1942), American ecologist and academic
- James Brown (engraver) (1819–1877), New Zealand engraver, caricaturist, and drawing tutor
- James Brown (hair stylist) (born 1969), Irish hair stylist
- James Brown (magician), British magic-performer
- James A. C. Brown (1911–1964), Scottish psychiatrist
- James Boyer Brown (1919–2009), Australian gynaecologist
- James Duff Brown (1862–1914), British librarian
- James Graham Brown (1881–1969), American businessman and real estate developer
- James Howard Brown (1884–1956), American bacteriologist
- James Joseph Brown (1854–1922), American mining businessman
- James MacLellan Brown (1886–1967), Scottish architect
- James Robert Brown (born 1949), Canadian philosopher
- James Smedley Brown (1819–1863), American educator of the deaf
- James William Brown (1897–1958), English physician
- Jim Brown (computer scientist) (born 1943), American computer scientist with IBM
- Jimmy Brown (Irish republican) (1956–1992), activist and paramilitary leader
- James Failla (1919–1999), also known as Jimmy Brown, member of the Gambino crime family
- James Stephens Brown (Mormon) (1828–1902), American mormon, participant of the California Gold Rush
- James Brown (internet personality) (born 1999), Nigerian internet personality
- James Campbell Brown (1843–1910), chemist and professor
- James H. Brown (judge) (1818–1900), West Virginia judge
- James Johnston Mason Brown (1908–1964), Scottish paediatric surgeon
- Henry Earl (1949–2024), American folk hero arrested approximately 1,500 times, nicknamed "James Brown"

== Other ==
- "James Brown" (song), 1989, by Big Audio Dynamite
- "James Brown Is Dead", a 1991 song by L.A. Style
- "The Three Bells", a 1959 song also known as "The Jimmy Brown Song", "Little Jimmy Brown", or "Jimmy Brown"

== See also ==
- Brown's Hotel, London, London's oldest existing hotel, founded by James Brown in 1831
- Djämes Braun, Danish singer
- Jamie Brown (disambiguation)
- Jim Brown (disambiguation)
- James Broun (disambiguation)
- James Browne (disambiguation)
- James Browning (disambiguation)
