= Deaths in November 1995 =

The following is a list of notable deaths in November 1995.

Entries for each day are listed alphabetically by surname. A typical entry lists information in the following sequence:

- Name, age, country of citizenship at birth, subsequent country of citizenship (if applicable), reason for notability, cause of death (if known), and reference.

== November 1995 ==
=== 1 ===
- Richard Ashcraft, 57, American political theorist.
- Helen Bullock, 89-90, American historian.
- Rocco Canale, 78, American football player (Steagles, Philadelphia Eagles, Boston Yanks).
- James Ralph Darling, 96, English-Australian chairman of ABC.
- Lex Hixon, 53, American Sufi author, poet, and spiritual teacher, cancer.
- Bill Hudson, 85, British Special Operations Executive officer.
- Vasil Iljoski, 92, Macedonian writer and dramatist.
- George McCowan, 68, Canadian film and television director, pulmonary emphysema.
- Erika Morini, 91, Austrian violinist.
- Alun Pask, 58, Welsh rugby player.
- W. E. D. Ross, 82, Canadian writer.
- Desmond Shawe-Taylor, 88, English music critic.
- Brian Lenihan Snr, 64, Irish politician and minister.
- Tom Spencer, 81, English cricket player and umpire.
- Bradbury Thompson, 84, American graphic designer and art director.

=== 2 ===
- Bill Blair, 84, American auto racer.
- June Brewster, 82, American actress.
- Mihajlo Dimitrijević, 68, Yugoslav Olympic high jumper (1952).
- Sal Gliatto, 93, American baseball player (Cleveland Indians).
- Florence Greenberg, 82, record company founder.
- Luo Guibo, 88, Chinese diplomat and politician.
- Ollie Harrington, 83, American cartoonist.
- Álvaro Gómez Hurtado, 76, Columbian politician, homicide.
- Gil Lamb, 91, American actor.
- Leonard Stewart, 88, British Olympic speed skater (1928).
- Gabriel Urgebadze, 66, Georgian Orthodox monk.

=== 3 ===
- R. Tucker Abbott, 76, American conchologist and malacologist.
- Bojan Adamič, 83, Slovenian composer.
- Arthur Bottomley, 88, British Labour politician and minister.
- Mario Revollo Bravo, 76, Colombian Catholic Cardinal and Archbishop.
- Jerome Caja, 37, American mixed-media painter, drag queen, and performance artist, AIDS.
- Cookie Cunningham, 90, American football and basketball player (Chicago Bears, Staten Island Stapletons).
- Wallas Eaton, 78, English film, radio, television and theatre actor.
- Gordon S. Fahrni, 108, Canadian physician and president of the Canadian Medical Association.
- John Orchard, 66, British actor (M*A*S*H).
- Edward Pola, 88, American radio and TV producer, and lyricist.
- William M. Rountree, 78, American diplomat, cancer.
- Cordelia Urueta, 87, Mexican artist.
- Isang Yun, 78, Korean-German composer.
- Gojko Zec, 60, Serbian football manager, homicide.

=== 4 ===
- John Cahill, 65, British businessman, and the chief executive of British Aerospace.
- Marti Caine, 50, British comedienne, singer and television host, lymphatic cancer.
- Revels Cayton, 87–88, American civil rights leader.
- Gilles Deleuze, 70, French philosopher, suicide.
- Paul Eddington, 68, English actor, lymphoma.
- Eddie Egan, 65, American actor, cancer.
- Essex Hemphill, 38, American poet and gay rights activist, AIDS-related complications.
- Yizhak Rabin, 73, 5th Prime Minister of Israel, assassinated.
- Morrie Schwartz, 78, American professor of sociology and author, ALS.
- Prawitz Öberg, 64, Swedish football player, bone cancer.

=== 5 ===
- Walter Dobler, 75, Canadian gridiron football player.
- Gene Englund, 78, American basketball player (Boston Celtics, Tri-Cities Blackhawks).
- Ernest Gellner, 69, British-Czech philosopher and social anthropologist.
- Gordon Walters, 76, New Zealand artist and graphic designer.

=== 6 ===
- Larry Cannon, 58, American racecar driver, embolism.
- Bill Cheesbourg, 68, American racecar driver, cancer.
- Aneta Corsaut, 62, American actress (The Blob, The Andy Griffith Show, Matlock), cancer.
- Chiaki Matsuda, 99, Japanese admiral in the Imperial Japanese Navy during World War II.

=== 7 ===
- Andrea Adams, 49, British broadcaster and journalist for the BBC, ovarian cancer.
- Emery Bonett, 88, English author and playwright.
- Dimitri Dimakopoulos, 66, Greek-Canadian architect.
- Lars Dresler, 27, Danish figure skater and Olympian (1988), undisclosed disease.
- Ann Dunham, 52, American anthropologist and mother of US president Barack Obama, cancer.
- Alfredo Mendes, 85, Brazilian Olympic high jumper (1936).
- John Patrick, 90, American screenwriter and playwright and winner of the Pulitzer Prize for Drama, suicide.
- Slappy White, 74, American comedian and actor, heart attack.

=== 8 ===
- Fernando Bello, 71, Portuguese sailor and Olympic medalist (1948, 1952, 1960, 1964).
- Neil Blaney, 73, Irish politician.
- Suzanne Borel, 91, French diplomat.
- Francis Cleveland, 92, American stage actor, director, producer, and son of president Grover Cleveland.
- Oleh Makarov, 66, Soviet/Ukrainian football player, coach, and sports writer.
- Gertrude Messinger, 84, American film actress, pneumonia.
- Country Dick Montana, 40, American singer, aneurysm.
- Veselin Petrović, 66, Yugoslavian cyclist and Olympian (1956, 1960).

=== 9 ===
- Morley Baer, 79, American photographer and teacher.
- Alessandro Cicognini, 89, Italian composer prolific in film music.
- Robert O. Cook, 92, American sound engineer.
- F. G. Emmison, 88, British archivist and historian.
- Sigfrid Heyner, 86, Swedish Olympic swimmer (1932).
- Geraldine Katt, 75, Austrian actress.
- Richard Morris, 74, British middle-distance runner and Olympian (1948).

=== 10 ===
- Ria De Simone, 48, Italian actress and singer, brain cancer.
- Clairmonte Depeiaza, 67, West Indian cricketer.
- Jean Maurice Fiey, 81, French Dominican Father, Church historian and Syriacist.
- Curly Fox, 85, American fiddler.
- Ken Saro-Wiwa, 54, Nigerian writer and environmentalist, execution by hanging.
- Franco Silva, 75, Italian actor.
- René Wellek, 92, Czech-American writer.

=== 11 ===
- Corneliu Coposu, 81, Romanian politician, lung cancer.
- Jean-Louis Curtis, 78, French novelist.
- Leo Dwyer, 88, Australian rules footballer.
- Kenneth S. Goldstein, 68, American folklorist and enthomusicologist.
- Koloman Gögh, 47, Czechoslovak football player, traffic collision.
- Bill Jordan, 89, Australian rules footballer.
- Grahame Parker, 83, English sportsman.
- Charles Scribner IV, 74, American publisher.

=== 12 ===
- Jackie Mann, 81, British fighter pilot.
- Richard L. Coe, 81, longtime theater and cinema critic for The Washington Post.
- Roland Dobrushin, 66, Russian mathematician.
- Paul Frantz, 80, Luxembourgian Olympic cyclist (1936).
- Bill Gnaden, 63, Australian rules footballer.
- Emmett Matthew Hall, 97, Canadian jurist, judge, and civil liberties advocate.
- Sir Robert Stephens, 64, English actor (The Private Life of Sherlock Holmes, Cleopatra, Empire of the Sun), complications following surgery.
- Willie Telfer, 70, Scottish football player and manager.

=== 13 ===
- Hanafy Bastan, 73, Egyptian footballer and Olympian (1948, 1952).
- Ralph Blane, 81, American songwriter, composer, lyricist, arranger, and singer.
- Mary Elizabeth Counselman, 83, American writer of short stories and poetry.
- Rote Hellström, 87, Finnish Olympic sailor (1948).
- Juan Llabot, 83, Venezuelan Olympic sports shooter (1956, 1968).
- Edward Nasserden, 76, Canadian politician, member of the House of Commons of Canada (1958-1968).
- Erdoğan Partener, 66, Turkish Olympic basketball player (1952).
- Adriana Serra, 71, Italian film actress.
- Orlando Sirola, 67, Italian tennis player.
- Arthur Dale Trendall, 86, New Zealand-Australian art historian and classical archaeologist.
- John Van Eyssen, 73, South African actor.

=== 14 ===
- Jack Finney, 84, American author (The Body Snatchers), emphysema and pneumonia.
- Jack Holt, 83, British sailboat designer.
- Les Horvath, 74, American football quarterback and halfback (Ohio State Buckeyes, Los Angeles Rams, Cleveland Browns) .
- John Lee-Barber, 90, British Royal Navy officer.
- Jacob Rader Marcus, 99, American scholar and Reform rabbi.
- Simon H. Rifkind, 94, American lawyer and district judge (United States District Court for the Southern District of New York).
- János Tamás, 59, Hungarian-Swiss composer, conductor and music educator.

=== 15 ===
- J. B. Andrews, 88, American football player.
- Karen Berg, 89, Danish actress.
- Joe F. Blair, 72, American sports publicist for the University of Maryland and the Washington Redskins.
- Billy Hughes, 81, British educationist and Labour Party politician.
- Sol Liptzin, 94, American-Israeli scholar, author, and professor of literature.
- J. Clyde Mitchell, 77, British sociologist and anthropologist.
- John W. Mitchell, 80, American Air Force officer and flying ace during World War II.
- Ottokar Pohlmann, 83, German Olympic equestrian (1960).

=== 16 ===
- Robert H. Adleman, 76, American novelist and historian.
- D. Woodrow Bird, 83, American politician.
- Jim J. Brown, 70, Australian rules footballer.
- Charles Gordone, 70, American playwright, actor, and director, liver cancer.
- Ralph Kronig, 91, German physicist.
- Conrad Lynn, 87, American civil rights lawyer and activist.
- Petre Prličko, 88, Macedonian actor.
- Gwyn A. Williams, 70, Welsh historian.

=== 17 ===
- Agasi Babayan, 73, Armenian director, screenwriter, and actor.
- Yevhen Bulanchyk, 73, Soviet Ukrainian Olympic hurdler (1952).
- Alan Hull, 50, English singer-songwriter (Lindisfarne), thrombosis.
- Mohammad Said Keruak, 69, Malaysian politician.
- Norman Kirkman, 75, English football player and manager.
- Salvatore Martirano, 68, American composer.
- Pete Welding, 60, American historian, archivist, and record producer, heart attack.
- Marguerite Young, 87, American writer.

=== 18 ===
- Francisco de Borbón y Borbón, 83, Spanish aristocrat and military officer.
- John G. Collier, 60, British chemical engineer.
- Jacques Ertaud, 71, French film director and screenwriter.
- Miron Grindea, 86, Romanian-British literary journalist.
- Branko Kallay, 86, Yugoslavian Olympic decathlete (1928).
- Mohammed Khaïr-Eddine, 54, Moroccan poet and writer.
- Reinhard Kolldehoff, 81, German film actor.

=== 19 ===
- Don Anielak, 65, American basketball player (New York Knicks).
- Charles Doe, 97, American rugby player and Olympian (1920, 1924).
- Don Goldie, 65, American jazz trumpeter.
- Wan Guchan, 95, Chinese filmmaker.
- Martha Hill, 94, American modern dancer.
- Ed Wright, 76, American baseball player (Boston Braves, Philadelphia Athletics), cancer.

=== 20 ===
- George Burns, 76, New Zealand coxswain.
- Lester Finch, 86, English football player, manager, and Olympian (1936).
- Robin Gandy, 76, British mathematician and logician.
- Sergei Grinkov, 28, Russian figure skater and Olympic gold medalist (1988, 1994), heart attack.
- Robie Macauley, 76, American editor, novelist and critic.
- Leotis Martin, 56, American boxer.
- Martand Singh, 72, Indian wildlife conservationist and politician.
- Kim Sung-jae, 23, South Korean singer, rapper, dancer, and model, murdered.

=== 21 ===
- Matthew Ashman, 35, English guitarist, complications from diabetes.
- Primrose Bordier, 66, French designer.
- Stan Fanning, 57, American football player (Chicago Bears, Los Angeles Rams, Denver Broncos).
- Bruno Gerussi, 67, Canadian actor (The Beachcombers), heart attack.
- Peter Grant, 60, English rock band manager for The Yardbirds and Led Zeppelin, heart failure.
- Fred Holliday, 59, American stage, film, and television actor, heart attack
- Dorothy Jeakins, 81, American costume designer (The Ten Commandments, The Sound of Music, Samson and Delilah), Oscar winner (1949, 1951, 1965).
- Noel Jones, 54, British diplomat.
- Leon Lishner, 82, American operatic bass baritone.
- Leila Mourad, 77, Egyptian singer and actress.
- Wim de Ruyter, 77, Dutch cyclist.
- George Ivan Smith, 80, Australian diplomat.
- Wilfred White, 91, English Olympic equestrian (1952, 1956).

=== 22 ===
- Leonardo Bercovici, 87, American screenwriter, film director and producer.
- Margaret St. Clair, 84, American fantasy and science fiction writer.
- Tom Clay, 66, American radio personality and disc jockey, lung cancer.
- Edna Deane, 90, English ballroom dancer, choreographer and drama teacher.
- Elinborg Lützen, 76, Danish graphic designer.
- Norman Potter, 72, English cabinetmaker, designer and writer.
- Maria Cumani Quasimodo, 87, Italian actress and dancer.
- Art Smith, 89, American baseball player (Chicago White Sox).
- Sergey Stechkin, 75, Soviet/Russian mathematician.
- Johnnie Tillmon, 69, American welfare rights activist.

=== 23 ===
- Henri Bonzano, 92, French Olympic rower (1924, 1928).
- John Frederick Collins, 76, American politician and Mayor of Boston, pneumonia.
- Louis Malle, 63, French film director (Atlantic City, Elevator to the Gallows, My Dinner with Andre), lymphoma.
- Bernard M. Oliver, 79, American scientist.
- Dan Page, 65, American gridiron football player.
- Lee Rogers, 82, American baseball player (Boston Red Sox, Brooklyn Dodgers).
- Einari Teräsvirta, 80, Finnish Olympic gymnast (1932, 1936, 1948).
- Junior Walker, 64, American musician and recording artist, cancer.
- Steven Wood, 34, Australian canoeist and Olympian (1988, 1992), suicide.

=== 24 ===
- Ivar Bjare, 52, Swedish Olympic luger (1968).
- John Craven, 79, American actor.
- Dominic Ekandem, 78, Nigerian Roman Catholic cardinal.
- Stuart Henry, 53, Scottish disc jockey, multiple sclerosis.
- Irene Hickson, 80, American baseball player.
- Leslie O'Brien, Baron O'Brien of Lothbury, 87, English peer and Governor of the Bank of England.
- Jeffrey Lynn, 89, American actor (Four Daughters, A Letter to Three Wives, BUtterfield 8).
- Malcolm Munthe, 85, British soldier, writer, and curator.
- Eduard Ole, 97, Estonian painter.
- Paul van de Rovaart, 91, Dutch Olympic field hockey player (1928).

=== 25 ===
- Ángel Cappelletti, 67-68, Argentine philosopher and university professor.
- Édouard Chabert, 92, French Olympic sailor (1952).
- Nikolai Drozdetsky, 38, Russian ice hockey player and Olympian (1984), diabetes.
- Helge Hagerman, 85, Swedish actor and film producer.
- Leif Juster, 85, Norwegian comedian, singer and actor.
- Roger McKenzie, 24, English musician and DJ, heart problems.
- Boris Rytsarev, 65, Soviet/Russian film director.
- Erich Schellow, 80, German actor.
- Richard G. Shoup, 71, American politician, member of the United States House of Representatives (1971-1975).
- Léon Zitrone, 81, Russian-French journalist and television presenter, stroke.

=== 26 ===
- Roberto Bachi, 86, Italian-Israeli statistician and demographer.
- Sydney Dawson Bailey, 79, English author, pacifist, and expert on international affairs.
- David Briggs, 51, American record producer, lung cancer.
- Maurice Britt, 76, American football player, Medal of Honor recipient, and businessman.
- Frank Cole, 83, British Olympic basketball player (1948).
- Terri L. Jewell, 41, American author, poet and Black lesbian activist.
- Toshia Mori, 83, Japanese-born American actress, traffic collision.
- Bengt Palmquist, 72, Swedish sailor and Olympian (1956, 1960, 1968).
- Shankar Dayal Singh, 57, Indian politician, cardiac arrest.
- Sanae Takasugi, 77, Japanese actress.
- Wim Thoelke, 68, German TV entertainer.
- Charles Warrell, 106, English schoolteacher and creator of the I-Spy book series.

=== 27 ===
- Giancarlo Baghetti, 60, Italian Formula One driver, cancer.
- Simon Bailey, 40, British Anglican priest and writer, AIDS-related complications.
- Martín Colmenarejo, 59, Spanish racing cyclist.
- Werner Moring, 68, German Olympic cross-country skier (1956).
- Edgar Newham, 81, Australian rugby league footballer.
- Albert Ouzoulias, 80, French communist leader of the French Resistance during World War II
- Alex Schibanoff, 76, American football player (Detroit Lions).
- Harry Taylor, 71, British Olympic alpine skier (1948).
- Jürgen Wattenberg, 94, German U-boat commander and POW escapee during World War II.

=== 28 ===
- Sukhan Babayev, 85, Soviet-Turkmenistan politician and General Secretary of the Communist Party of Turkmenistan.
- Richard C. Halverson, 79, American Presbyterian minister and author.
- Brunhilde Hendrix, 57, German relay runner and Olympic silver medalist (1960).
- Slobodan Ivković, 58, Serbian basketball player and coach.
- Roy A. Taylor, 85, American politician, member of the United States House of Representatives (1960-1977).
- David James Walker, 90, Canadian politician, member of the House of Commons of Canada (1957-1962).

=== 29 ===
- Tanaka Chikao, 90, Japanese playwright and dramatist.
- Wu De, 82, Chinese communist revolutionary and politician.
- Irene Ighodaro, 79, Sierra Leonean doctor and social reformer.
- Anthony LaRette, 44, American rapist and serial killer, execution by lethal injection.
- Leon McQuay, 45, American gridiron football player (New York Giants, New England Patriots, New Orleans Saints).
- Roger Norman, 67, Swedish triple jumper and Olympian (1952).
- Augusto H. Álvarez, 80, Mexican architect.
- Jožef Velker, 82, Yugoslavian footballer.

=== 30 ===
- Niklaus Aeschbacher, 78, Swiss composer and conductor.
- Jim Davis, 71, American baseball player (Chicago Cubs, St. Louis Cardinals, New York Giants).
- June Fisher, 66, British teacher and trade unionist.
- Philip Givens, 73, Canadian politician and judge.
- Til Kiwe, 85, German actor and screenwriter.
- František Kratochvíl, 91, Czech Olympic wrestler (1924, 1928).
- Hopper Levett, 87, British cricket player.
- Rafael Portillo, 79, Mexican film director, screenwriter and film editor.
- William Roerick, 82, American actor, traffic collision.
- Stretch, 27, American rapper, drive-by shooting, homicide.
- William Suero, 29, Dominican baseball player (Milwaukee Brewers).

== Sources ==
- Liebman, Roy (2000). The Wampas Baby Stars: A Biographical Dictionary, 1922–1934. Jefferson, North Carolina: McFarland. ISBN 0-7864-0756-5.
