= Jim Brown (disambiguation) =

Jim Brown (1936–2023) was an American football player and actor.

Jim Brown may also refer to:

== Arts and entertainment ==
- Jim Ed Brown (1934–2015), American country music singer
- Jim Brown (director) (born 1950), American film director
- Jim Brown (radio host), Canadian radio host

== Politics ==
- Jim Brown (New South Wales politician) (1918–1999), Australian politician
- Jim N. Brown (1926–1991), Michigan politician
- Jim Brown (Western Australian politician) (1927–2020), Australian politician
- Jim Brown (Ontario politician) (1943–2020), Canadian politician

== Sports ==
=== Association football ===
- Jim Brown (Cowdenbeath footballer) (died 1955), Scottish footballer
- Jim Brown (soccer, born 1908) (1908–1994), Scottish-American soccer player
- Jim Brown (footballer, born 1939) (1939–2015), Scottish footballer (Dumbarton, Darlington)
- Jim Brown (footballer, born 1950), Scottish footballer (Hearts, Hibernian)
- Jim Brown (footballer, born 1952), Scottish footballer (Sheffield United)

=== Baseball ===
- Jim Brown (pitcher) (1860–1908), American baseball player
- Jim Brown (catcher) (1892–1943), American Negro league baseball player
- Jim Brown (outfielder) (1897–1944), American baseball outfielder

=== Other sports ===
- Jim Brown (sprinter) (1909–2000), Canadian athlete
- Jim Brown (basketball) (1912–1991), American professional basketball player
- Jim J. Brown (1925–1995), Australian rules footballer for Geelong
- Jim W. Brown (1926–2014), Australian rules footballer for Fitzroy
- Jim Brown (ice hockey) (born 1960), American ice hockey player
- Jim Brown (darts player) (born 1971), Scottish darts player
- Jim Brown (rugby union), Welsh international rugby union player

== Others ==
- Jim Brown (computer scientist) (born 1943), American computer scientist with IBM
- Jim Brown (interpreter) (born 1953), American translator
- Thiruchelvam Nihal Jim Brown (1972–2006), Sri Lankan parish priest who disappeared during the Sri Lankan Civil War
- Jim Brown (banker), New Zealand banker
- Jim Brown (game designer), American video game designer with Epic Games

== Other uses ==
- Jim Brown: All-American, 2002 documentary film about the American football player
- Jim Brown Award (disambiguation), football awards named after the American football player
- Jim Brown House, historical place in Peninsula, Ohio
- Jim Brown Shield, Australian ice hockey award named after a Scottish-born Australian ice hockey player

== See also ==
- James Brown (disambiguation)
- Jim Browning (disambiguation)
