= James S. Brown (disambiguation) =

James S. Brown (1824–1878) was a mayor of Milwaukee, Wisconsin, and member of U.S. House of Representatives.

James S. Brown may also refer to:

- James S. Brown Jr. (1892–1949), American cinematographer
- James Smedley Brown (1819–1863), American educator of the deaf
- James Stephens Brown (1858–1946), mayor of Nashville, Tennessee
- James Stephens Brown (Mormon) (1828–1902), American mormon, participant of the California Gold Rush
- James Sutherland Brown (1881–1951), Canadian general and war planner
