= Whitehill Secondary School =

Coordinates: 55.86087°N 4.21283°W

Location
- 280 Onslow Drive; Glasgow, G31 2QF; Scotland

Information
- Type: Comprehensive school
- Motto: Altiora Peto (I seek Higher Things)
- Established: 1891
- Local authority: Glasgow City Council
- Head teacher: Ruth McConachie
- Gender: Mixed
- Enrolment: c.600 (August 2022)
- Colour

Whitehill Secondary School (formerly Whitehill Senior Secondary School) is a Scottish non-denominational comprehensive secondary school located in the suburb of Dennistoun in Glasgow. The school is a part of the Whitehill Campus, along with Golfhill Primary School and Westercraigs Nursery. The campus was assembled in 2007, following the closure of the Golfhill Primary building due to structural issues. The school moved into the main building in 2009, with Westercraigs having their own structure.

== History ==
The school was founded in 1891 as Whitehill Senior Secondary School in a large red sandstone building in Dennistoun's Whitehill Street. The old school was demolished after the new school was opened in 1977 at its present location in Dennistoun's Onslow Drive renamed Whitehill Secondary School. As part of Glasgow City Council's Project 2002, the school was refurbished and modernised.

== Whitehill Learning Community ==
The school leads a community of schools known as a Learning Community. This consists of a number of local schools in the area including primary, nursery and special education schools:

- Whitehill Secondary School
- Onslow Drive Day Nursery
- Westercraigs Nursery School
- Alexandra Parade Primary School
- Golfhill Primary School
- Haghill Park Primary School (including Nursery Class)
- Parkhill Secondary School

== Notable staff ==
Notable staff included William Oliver Brown and John Bevan Baker.

== Notable former pupils ==
Notable alumni of Whitehill Secondary School include:

- June Almeida (virologist)
- Hugh Brown MP (Scottish Labour politician)
- Jamie Brown (UK delegate to UNICEF C8 Summit)
- Rikki Fulton (actor and comedian)
- Alasdair Gray (artist and author)
- Jack House (journalist and author)
- Ford Kiernan (comedian and actor famous for Still Game and Chewin' The Fat)
- Lulu (Scottish singer, actress and TV personality)
- James McArthur (Scottish international footballer)
- Dorothy Paul (comedian)
- Bill Paterson (actor and writer)
- Jim Tolmie (footballer, Manchester City, Lokeren, Morton)
