= James Browne =

James or Jim Browne may refer to:

== Law and politics ==
- James Browne (died 1790) (1737–1790), Irish politician, MP for Jamestown, Tuam and Castlebar
- James Browne, 2nd Baron Kilmaine (1765–1825), Irish peer and MP for Carlow Borough
- James Browne (1793–1854) (1793–1854), Irish politician, MP for Mayo
- James Browne (Fianna Fáil politician) (born 1975), Irish Fianna Fáil politician, TD for Wexford

== Religion ==
- James Browne (theologian) (1616–1685), English theologian
- James Browne (bishop of Kilmore) (died 1865), Irish Roman Catholic bishop
- James Browne (bishop of Ferns) (1842–1917), Irish Roman Catholic bishop
- James Browne (priest) (fl. 1867–1894), British Archdeacon of Madras

== Sports ==
- Jim Browne (1930–2003), American basketball player
- Jim Browne (American football) (born 1962), American football player
- James Browne (athlete) (born 1966), Antiguan athlete

== Others ==
- James Browne (pirate) (died 1677), Scottish pirate active in the Caribbean
- James Browne (writer) (1793–1841), Scottish man of letters
- James Frankfort Manners Browne (1823–1910), Anglo-Irish officer in the British Army
- James Browne (Indian Army officer) (1839–1896), Anglo-Indian engineer and administrator
- James Crichton-Browne (1840–1938), British psychiatrist
- James Howard Browne (1919–2004), Australian amateur botanist and plant photographer
- James C. Browne (1935–2018), American computer scientist
- James J. Browne, Irish university president

== See also ==
- James Broun (disambiguation)
- James Brown (disambiguation)
