= Charles Buchanan =

Charles Buchanan may refer to:

- Charles Pakenham Buchanan (1874–1924), mayor of Brisbane, Queensland
- Charles James Buchanan (1899–1984), high sheriff of Nottinghamshire
- Charles P. Buchanan (1898–1984), publisher and manager at the Savoy Ballroom in Harlem, New York City
- Charles Allen Buchanan (1904–2001), commandant of midshipmen at the United States Naval Academy
- Rev. Charles Buchanan, a character in the American television show The 5 Mrs. Buchanans
