= Marvel Cooke =

African-American journalist and activist (1903–2000)

- Marvel Cooke, c. 1950s
- Born: Marvel Jackson; April 4, 1903; Mankato, Minnesota
- Died: November 29, 2000 (aged 97); Sugar Hill, Manhattan
- Occupations: Journalist, writer, civil rights activist
- Employer(s): New York Amsterdam News, The Crisis, The People's Voice, The Daily Compass, North Carolina Agricultural and Technical College
- Organization(s): Newspaper Guild, National Council of Arts, Sciences and Professions, American-Soviet Friendship Committee
- Known for: First African-American woman to work at a mainstream white-owned newspaper; assistant to W. E. B. Du Bois
- Political party: Communist Party, USA
- Spouse: Cecil Cooke
- Relatives: Helen J. Claytor (sister)

Marvel Jackson Cooke (April 4, 1903 – November 29, 2000) was a pioneering American journalist, writer, and civil rights activist. She was the first African-American woman to work at a mainstream white-owned newspaper.

== Early life and education ==
Marvel Jackson was the first black child to be born in Mankato, Minnesota. Her parents were Madison Jackson and Amy Wood Jackson. Her father was an Ohio State University law school graduate and the first black member of the South Dakota Bar, but he was unable to find employment as a black lawyer; her mother once lived on a Native American reservation as a cook and cooking teacher. Amy Wood Jackson left her position on the reservation in South Dakota after witnessing the unfair treatment of the Native Americans there, to become a full time homemaker and mother for Marvel and her three sisters.

Marvel experienced the effects of racial discrimination from a young age. She was raised in an upper-class, white neighborhood in Minneapolis, where her family moved in 1907. After first purchasing their home, residents held demonstrations on the Jackson's lawn in protest of a black family moving into the area. The schools in the area had not yet desegregated, but Marvel's enrollment in her elementary school and high school desegregated both institutions. She overheard her favorite teacher use racial slurs when she was in elementary school, and her best childhood friend rejected her when she was seventeen because she was black.

In 1921, Marvel enrolled at the University of Minnesota. Only four other black women were enrolled with her; the entire student body at the time amounted to 20,000. She helped to establish an Alpha Kappa Alpha chapter at the university while she attended.

While enrolled in college, Marvel took a government examination to qualify for a position as a Spanish translator for the War Department. Her score qualified her for hire, but her boss gave her a job as a file clerk after lying and telling her the translation department was not yet established. Cooke later found out that the department was established with only white women on staff; she contacted Senator Henrik Shipstead, who responded and helped reassign her to the translation department.

In 1925, Marvel graduated from the University of Minnesota with a degree in English, at the age of 22.

== Career ==
Cooke was offered a job as assistant to W. E. B. Du Bois, editor of the NAACP magazine The Crisis, and in 1926 moved to New York City, settling in Harlem, during the Harlem Renaissance. Before working at The Crisis, she had neither taken a journalism course nor had she worked for a newspaper. Her ability as a writer was recognized by Du Bois, who put her in charge of a column in the magazine, where her brief tenure included writing critiques of works by the literary giants of the day, including Langston Hughes, Zora Neale Hurston, and Dorothy Parker. In addition to writing the column, named "In the Magazines," Cooke laid out the newspaper.

Mentored by Du Bois, she became friendly with leading writers and artists, including Paul Robeson, Countee Cullen, Elizabeth Catlett, Richard Wright, Langston Hughes, Arna Bontemps, and James Weldon Johnson. She broke off her engagement to (later NAACP leader) Roy Wilkins because she thought him too conservative.

In 1927, she went to work on the New York Amsterdam News, where she was the first woman reporter in their 40-year history. In 1929, she married Jamaican-born Cecil Cooke – a graduate of Columbia University, who was the world's fastest quarter-miler when she met him; their marriage would last until his death in 1978. After marrying, they moved to Greensboro, North Carolina, where Marvel taught history, English and Latin in the high-school department of North Carolina Agricultural and Technical College.

Returning to New York and the Amsterdam News in 1931, she helped found the first chapter in New York of the Newspaper Guild and was involved in strike action at the News, joining the picket for 11 weeks when the editorial workers union was locked out; the strike was finally ended on Christmas Eve 1934. Cooke disliked the crime stories she was assigned by the News, finding distasteful the paper's handling of such stories, and preferring to expand the paper's coverage of the arts – for instance, traveling at her own cost to cover Marian Anderson's historic open-air concert at the Lincoln Memorial in 1939. She also reported stories that she believed would be informative for the black community, publishing a front-page story that exposed problematic working conditions for the Apollo Theater's dancers and a series that analyzed rising crime rates in Harlem. Cooke eventually left the paper for good in 1940. She disliked a sensational headline ("Killed Sweetheart, Slept With Body") and the sensational nature of the paper overall.

While working for the Amsterdam News, Cooke interviewed a wealthy woman at a Park Avenue apartment. She was not allowed to enter through the front door of the building because of her race, so she called the interviewee and cancelled the meeting. The interviewee then forced the apartment's management to allow Cooke in through the front.

From 1942 to 1947, Cooke worked on The People's Voice (a weekly owned by Adam Clayton Powell), as assistant managing editor. Crime news for The People's Voice was limited to a single brief column, suiting Cooke's journalistic preferences much more than the Amsterdam News. The newspaper went out of business in 1947. In 1950 she was hired by the New York paper The Daily Compass, becoming the first African-American woman to serve as a reporter for a mainstream white-owned newspaper; at the time she was one of only two black journalists employed there, along with Richard Carter. Her first series for the paper, beginning April 16, was "Occupation: Streetwalker" which chronicled the process of prostitution in the area; she also published a piece that detailed black children's drug use entitled "From Candy to Heroin." New York City officials began a program to decrease teenage drug addiction after "From Candy to Heroin" was published. The following year, to highlight the exploitation of black domestic workers in white homes she got herself hired along with others seeking work by the day and then described her experiences in a compelling five-part series for the Daily Compass entitled "The Bronx Slave Market", which was promoted with signs that said: Read: I Was a Slave, by Marvel Cooke. Cooke revealed many upsetting working conditions for domestic laborers, including how the white women who hired black women would pay significantly less than the rate established by the New York State Employment Service. Employers would also manipulate the hands on their clocks in order to trick workers into laboring an hour for free. In addition to publishing the piece, the newspaper published an editorial directly addressed to Mayor William O'Dwyer in an effort to curb the exploitation. The combined series and editorial led the Domestic Workers Union and the State Employment Agency to create courses for household workers and the American Labor Party sought standardized wages.

She remained with the Daily Compass until its closure in November 1952.

=== Activism ===
While working at the Amsterdam News in the 1930s, Cooke not only helped create a local chapter of the Newspaper Guild, the labor union of newspaper journalists, but also held union meetings in her home and subsequently participated in an eleven-week strike in 1936, during which she joined the Communist Party after convincing from journalist Benjamin J. Davis. She joined even though she may have been fired if her employers knew of her political affiliation. She was in the same party cell as Davis, Richard Wright, and Ollie Harrington.

She also formed a writing group to support creative authors; one of the participants was the first black writer to publish a Book-of-the-Month-Club selection, Richard Wright.

In the 1953, she became the New York director of the National Council of Arts, Sciences and Professions. The National Council brought together artists, scientists, and professionals for political unity; Arthur Miller and John Randolph were members.

In 1953, when she was called twice to testify regarding her involvement with the Communist Party before Senator Joseph McCarthy, in New York and Washington DC, she pleaded the Fifth Amendment.

Cooke began working with the Angela Davis Defense Committee in 1969 and she volunteered as national legal defense secretary of the Angela Davis Defense Fund in 1971. She coordinated committee activities in New York, raised money for Angela Davis's defense, and organized a rally at Madison Square Gardens. The rally had 16,000 participants and raised $40,000. In her later years, Cooke became national vice-chairman of the American-Soviet Friendship Committee.

Cooke died of leukemia in New York in 2000, at the age of 97, having lived most of her life at 409 Edgecombe Avenue, the legendary apartment building in Sugar Hill, that was home to many other black luminaries.

== Works ==
- Marvel Cooke, "The Bronx Slave Market (1950)", reprinted in Viewpoint Magazine 5 (October 2015).
- Marvel Cooke, "Occupation Streetwalker"
- Marvel Cooke, "From Candy to Heroin"

== See also ==
- List of civil rights leaders
