= Jamie Brown =

Jamie Brown is the name of:

- Jamie Brown (American football) (born 1972), American football player
- Jamie Brown (cricketer) (born 1993), New Zealand cricketer
- Jamie Allan Brown (born 1987), Scottish activist and campaigner
- Jamie Foster Brown (born 1946), owner and publisher of Sister 2 Sister magazine
- Jamie Brown (producer, born 1945), American producer and screenwriter, known from Toby McTeague or Kevin of the North
- Jamie Brown (producer, born 1966), American producer and screenwriter, known from Lucid
- Jamie Brown (composer) (born 1980), British classical composer
- Jamie Brown (rally driver), on the List of European Rally Championship drivers

== See also ==
- James Brown (disambiguation)
