= The People's Voice (newspaper) =

Newspaper from Harlem, New York City

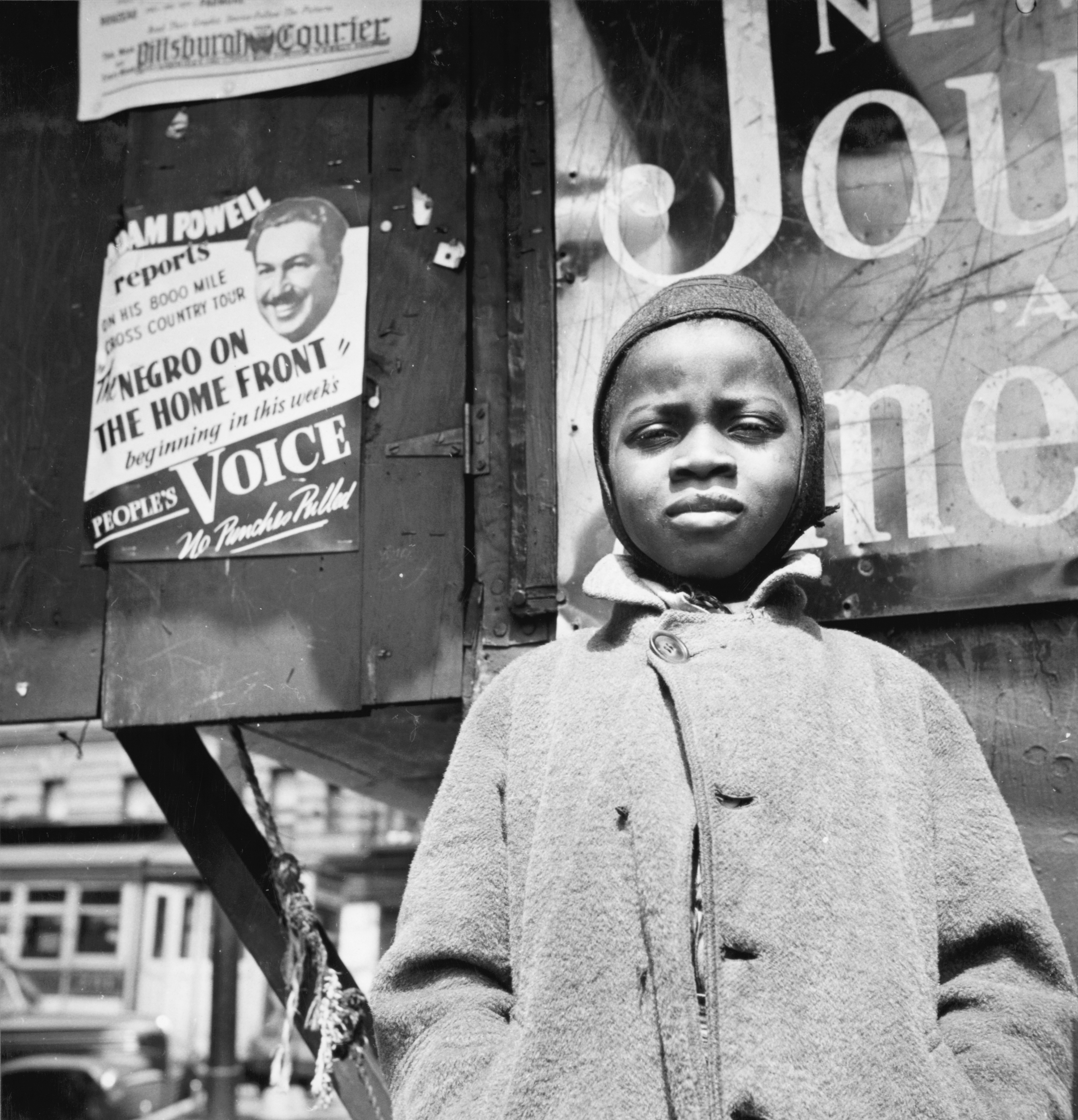
- A Harlem newsboy stands in front of a poster for a series in The People's Voice (May 1943).
- Founder: Adam Clayton Powell Jr.
- Publisher: Powell-Buchanan Pub. Co
- Editor-in-chief: Adam Clayton Powell Jr. (1942–1946); Denton J. Brooks Jr.; Max Yergan
- Founded: 1942
- Ceased publication: 1948
- Headquarters: New York City, New York, United States

The People's Voice, also known as Voice, was a newspaper based in Harlem, New York City to serve the African American community. Adam Clayton Powell Jr., a New York politician and pastor, founded the newspaper in 1942. Voice mainly focused on racial issues, local events and investigative news, but it also covered entertainment and sports. Many activists and writers contributed to Voice, including Ann Petry, Fredi Washington, and Marvel Cooke. The paper stopped publication in 1948 partly due to accusations that Voice was circulating Communist propaganda.

== History ==
Adam Clayton Powell Jr. founded The People's Voice in 1941. Powell's novice 1941 term in the New York city council was met with a lot of criticism from Harlem journalists. Supporter Charlie Buchanan, along with investor Mo Gale, encouraged Powell to start his own newspaper to mitigate these denunciations. Subsequently, Powell and Buchanan co-founded the Powell-Buchanan Publishing Company in New York City, located on 210 West 125th Street Harlem, New York City, in order to circulate this newspaper. Influenced by the Communist Party's ideals of a democratic coalition, Powell named the paper The People's Voice.

The paper also served other purposes: to propagate Powell's political ideals and set the stage for his eventual Congressional campaign. Additionally, Powell wanted to distinguish his paper from news companies like his former employer Amsterdam News, which he felt lacked "information for the democratically-minded African American reader". Powell recruited writers to jump ship from the Amsterdam News to Voice, including journalists Marvel Cooke and St. Claire Bourne

After releasing its first issue on February 14, 1942, Voice was published weekly. At the peak of its popularity, it sold about 40,000 – 50,000 copies per week.

The paper published criticisms of racism across industries and featured writers prominent in the Double V campaign initiated by the Pittsburgh Courier, which encouraged African Americans to fight for an end to White supremacy in Europe and in the United States. When Powell became the first African American congressman from New York in 1945, as historian Gerald Horne puts it, he was caught between activism and entrepreneurialism. In order to appease anti-Communists, he attempted to purge the newspaper of presumed Communists, including Fredi Washington and Doxey Wilkerson.

Shortly after winning his Congressional campaign, Powell resigned as editor and chairman of the Powell-Buchanan Publishing Corporation. He was replaced by Denton J. Brooks Jr., and then by Max Yergan.

Anti-Communist attacks on the paper, staffing turnover, and financial issues all contributed to its closure in 1948. In total, seven volumes of The People's Voice were published during its six-year run.

== Contributors ==
Adam Clayton Powell Jr., was the founder, editor, and co-publisher of The People's Voice. Powell was born in 1908 to Mattie Buster Shaffer and renowned Baptist preacher Adam Clayton Powell Sr. Powell founded The People's Voice after obtaining his college degree at Colgate University, and he served as the paper's editor until he was elected the first Black New York state representative in 1945.

Charles P. Buchanan was a co-founder of the Powell-Buchanan Publishing Company with its most notable publication being The People's Voice.

Moe Gale was an investor and also the founder of the Savoy Ballroom. Also known as Harlem's "Great White Father," Gale was an avid promoter of Black musical talents such as Ella Fitzgerald and The Ink Spots.

Journalist and activist Marvel Cooke worked as the assistant managing editor. Later in her career, she would break ground by becoming the first African American woman to work at The Daily Compass, a popular White newspaper.

Ann Petry, a writer and social activist whose work focused on African American life, also contributed to Voice as a reporter from 1941 to 1944. Years after she stopped writing for Voice, Petry broke records as the first African American woman to sell more than a million copies of a book with her novel The Street.

Another contributor was Fredi Washington, who was Powell's sister-in-law, a renowned Black actress, and co-founder of the Negro Actors Guild. As the paper's entertainment editor, she publicized local events and highlighted Black entertainers' careers and the challenges they confronted as Black artists.

== Content ==
The People's Voice covered a variety of topics, including racism in the city, entertainment, and opinion columns primarily written for the local African American audience of Harlem.

Voice advocated for the local community through direct suggestions to the city government. For example, after the 1943 Detroit race riot that killed 34 people, Powell used Voice to urge the New York City council to appoint an interracial committee that could advise on racial issues so "we won't have a Detroit in New York."

The People's Voice also launched its own investigations into local racial issues, especially with New York City's police force. For example, in April 1943, police closed a dance hall called the Savoy Ballroom due to alleged reports of prostitution in the location. However, Black leaders speculated it was due to racial integration on the dance floor and, in response, The People's Voice launched an investigation of local White dancing clubs. Additionally, in the spring of 1942, a Black Harlem resident, Wallace Armstrong, was killed by a White policeman, so The People's Voice launched an investigation of the police department while Powell organized protests. This earned the censure of Police Commissioner Lewis J. Valentine, who condemned Powell and his paper's activities as "dangerous" and "rabble-rousing".

Voice also collaborated with other civil rights groups in the city to spread awareness of their missions and provide advice to the Black community. Some examples of these organizations were the Council on African Affairs and the Universal Negro Improvement Association and African Communities League.

Besides local events, Voice also provided commentary on issues outside of New York City, especially when the events involved matters of race. Through his own "Soap Box" opinion column, Powell criticized the federal government for putting Japanese-Americans in internment camps, advocated India's struggle for independence from Britain, and spoke out against Fascists' murder of Jewish people in Poland.

One recurring theme throughout the paper's lifetime was its promotion of Powell's political career. During Powell's term in city council, the paper reported on his activities, speeches, and resolutions. While he ran his congressional campaign, the paper announced the schedule of his campaign events, headlined his involvement, and even published an endorsement from Eleanor Roosevelt for his candidacy. Later, the paper lauded his work in Congress, although he had long abandoned his editorial position by then. While Voice's staff did not mind Powell's use of the paper to promote his career, other Black activists, trade unionists, and politicians found it disturbing. Frank Crosswaith, socialist politician and trade unionist, disapproved of Powell's use of the paper to campaign for office: "the politics-minded people behind these newspapers," he wrote, need "a disturbed atmosphere" where they "effectively peddle their spurious wares" for their upcoming elections.

== Affiliations with communism ==
The People's Voice was controversial because of its alleged connections to the Communist Party. Powell presented himself as a political Independent, but many saw him as being influenced by Communism and its Popular Front. He specifically named the newspaper – The People's Voice – after Communist themes of shared ownership. Fittingly, this follows his career-long theme of invoking the "people" (he named his campaign volunteers "The People's Committee").

Apart from Powell himself, the staff of Voice included open sympathizers of Communism, such writers Marvel Cooke and Doxey Wilkerson, and even the succeeding editor-in-chief Max Yergan. Later, Powell's successor as New York City councilman and a former staff writer for Voice, Benjamin J. Davis Jr., made his political platform known through a recurring column in Voice that swung the tone of the paper further left.

However, support of communism was not a feature unique to this staff of writers; many progressive members of the Black community supported communist politicians, since the Communist party was the only U.S. political group to endorse anti-racism and anti-lynching laws.

The People's Voice's affiliation with communism did not escape the attention of the federal government. In 1943, the New York office of the FBI filed a report on Powell and his "communistic... nationalist tendencies". The report cited passages from The People's Voice that nearly led to Powell's criminal indictment. Powell's resignation from the paper in December 1946 resulted from advice that his affiliation with such a left-leaning organization might damage his political reputation.

While Powell's time was occupied in Congressional duties in Washington, Voice also published columns by Communist Party member and councilman Benjamin Davis that advocated for racial and economic justice. Critics' subsequent scorn of Voice's associations with Communism, combined with Powell firing certain staff members due to redbaiting, contributed to the paper's demise in 1948.
