= James Broun =

James Broun may refer to:

- Sir James Broun, 7th Baronet (1768–1844), of the Broun baronets
- Sir James Lionel Broun, 11th Baronet (1875–1962), of the Broun baronets
- James Broun-Ramsay, 1st Marquess of Dalhousie (1812–1860), Scottish statesman

== See also ==
- Djämes Braun, Danish singer
- James Brown (disambiguation)
- James Browne (disambiguation)
- Broun (surname)
