= James Browning =

James Browning is the name of:

- James Browning (Texas politician) (1850–1921), Texas politician and lawyer
- James R. Browning (1918–2012), U.S. Court of Appeals judge
- James L. Browning Jr. (1932–2016), California jurist
- James O. Browning (born 1956), U.S. District Court judge
- Jim Browning (trade unionist) (died 1983), British trade union leader
- Jim Browning (YouTuber), British YouTuber and scam baiter

== See also ==
- Jim Browning (disambiguation)
- James Brown (disambiguation)
