= Jim Browning =

Jim Browning may refer to:

- Jim Browning (trade unionist) (died 1983), British trade unionist
- Jim Browning (wrestler), (1903–1936), American professional wrestler
- Jim Browning (YouTuber), British YouTuber

== See also ==
- James Browning (disambiguation)
- Jim Brown (disambiguation)
