= Louisiana School for the Deaf =

School in Baton Rouge, Louisiana, US

Coordinates: 30°23′35″N 91°11′17″W

- Baton Rouge

Information
- Type: Public
- Motto: "Striving for Excellence"
- Established: December 8, 1852; 173 years ago
- School district: Serves all school districts and deaf or hard-of-hearing children in Louisiana
- Director: Dr. Natalie N. Delgado
- Grades: Pre-K–12, plus 0–3 years
- Colors: Kelly Green & White
- Athletics: Football, Basketball, Volleyball, Cheerleading, Powerlifting, Track & Field, Cross Country
- Athletics conference: Mason Dixon Conference
- Mascot: Eagle
- Nickname: War Eagles
- Affiliation: CEASD
- Website: www.ssdofla.org/o/lsd

The Louisiana School for the Deaf is a state school for deaf and hard-of-hearing students in Louisiana, located in Baton Rouge, the state capital. It was established in 1852 as a joint school for blind students. In 1860, its first purpose-built facility was completed and admired as an elegant monument to philanthropy. The schools were divided in 1898, and in 1908, Louisiana School for the Deaf was renamed.

Construction of facilities has continued over the years. In 1978, black students were absorbed when their school was merged into this one. The expanded school now has 22 major buildings, including a football stadium, on a 116-acre campus south of Louisiana State University on Brightside Lane. In 2009, the Louisiana School for the Visually Impaired (LSVI) was relocated here.

== Admission/Enrollment ==
Louisiana School for the Deaf offers a comprehensive pre-K–12 education for Louisiana's deaf and hard-of-hearing children ages 3–18 at no cost to their families.

Enrolling at the Louisiana School for the Deaf is possible by:

- Parental application: At each IEP conference, parents have the right to review the choices of educational placements available to their child. Louisiana law (Act 433) empowers parents to choose between the program offered by their local school system and the program offered by LSD. Parents can apply directly to LSD at any time during the school year.
- State Department of Education (SDE) referral: The local school system can refer a deaf/hard-of-hearing student to LSD through the SDE.
- The local school system can refer a deaf/hard-of-hearing student to LSD for an evaluation by the LSD Statewide Assessment Center for the Hearing Impaired (SWAC-HI) to determine levels of performance and program needs. The student attends LSD during the evaluation process.

== History ==
Before 1838, wealthy families provided private tutors for their deaf children (as for their hearing children) or paid for the children to attend a school for the deaf outside Louisiana. There was no public education in the state. The 1838 Louisiana legislature passed an act on January 16, 1838, to provide state-supported education of deaf white children by enrolling them at other state schools. As a result, 11 children from Louisiana were enrolled at state cost at the Kentucky School for the Deaf.

In 1852, Francis Dubose Richardson, a member of the General Assembly, introduced a bill to provide $25,000 and empowered a Board of Administrators to oversee the establishment of the Louisiana Institute for the Deaf and Dumb and the Blind. The bill was passed in March 1852 and approved by the governor. The seven board members were authorized to buy land, make contracts, and do whatever was necessary to begin the school. The first school was held in the former Baton Rouge College (now the Mayflower North campus). The board recruited James Smedley Brown from the Indiana Asylum of the Deaf and Dumb as superintendent. On December 8, 1852, the 11 Louisiana students and Brown arrived in Baton Rouge.

Original front gate of LSD

Notable achievements during 1852–1860 were completion of the state Administration Building on the campus, just south of Louisiana State University in Baton Rouge. The building was acclaimed as one of the most elaborate and elegant for that era. The new Administration Building was completed in 1858 and stood for 99 years. It was described by the Daily Gazette and Comet on July 21, 1857, as "the proud monument to the Christian philanthropy of the Sugar Bowl State."

The school hired a woman teacher, and began to include vocational training as part of the program. At the request of the school, the legislature appropriated funds for the purchase of a printing press and fonts. The school taught printing as a vocational skill. A carpenter on campus was enlisted to teach carpentry skills.

In 1860, the school had 60 students. By 1862, there were 72 students. As the fighting of the American Civil War drew closer to Baton Rouge during the Mississippi campaign, parents pulled their children out and only orphans remained at the school. Early in 1862, staff and students spotted gunboats on the Mississippi. The Union army found the school an easy target. A cannonball was said to be shot through the wide first-floor hall, landing at the rear of the school. Principal Martin and matron Mary Dufrocq ran to the riverbank a half-mile away and begged the commander to stop shooting and save the school. The Union Army took over the school as a hospital to care for federal soldiers.

In January 1863, the federal troops again seized Baton Rouge and the school, using it as a temporary hospital. Schooling continued. The soldiers ruined the printing equipment. But there was an advantage to having troops on site; General Augur permitted full rations to the school. From 1863 to 1867, the children had enough food and fuel.

On October 15, 1869, a fire destroyed the Louisiana State Seminary of Learning and Military Academy at Pineville. After the fire, governor Warmoth asked the board and administrators and superintendent J.A. McWhorter to use half of the deaf school for the seminary.

Major John Patton, professor of Greek at Louisiana State University, was appointed superintendent. Among his first tasks was to arrange for the deaf students to be relocated to another location. They used the former Heroman Building, on Church and Florida Streets (opposite the former State-Times and Morning Advocate building), as the third location of the school.

In 1884, the school had 56 students when Dr. John Jastremski was appointed superintendent. On taking office in 1885, he appointed Edith S. Rambo, who was trained at the Clarke School for the Deaf, as the first oral teacher. The student-operated Deaf Mute Pelican, the forerunner of The Pelican, began publication in 1859. In 1892, the print shop and sewing department were enlarging. Carpentry, cabinet making, and glazing were taught. In 1892, another articulation teacher was hired, and a shoe shop installed.

The 1898 act separated the two schools for deaf and blind students and set up two boards. It established goals of both sets of children receiving a good education, instruction in hygiene and physical culture (physical education), and industrial (vocational) training, felt to be the key to the changing industrial society. Basketball was brought for the girls and the boys played football. Superintendent S.T. Walker lobbied to change the institution's name to reflect its mission. On July 8, 1908, a bill changing the name to the Louisiana School for the Deaf became law.

=== Southern School for the Deaf (SSD) (1938–1978) ===
The segregated State School for the Blind and Deaf for Blacks, founded by the Reconstruction-era legislature in the late 1860s with other welfare institutions, was later put under the supervision of Southern University, a historically black college. In 1938, it was separated into two schools, as had been done for white children: the School for the Blind and the School for the Deaf. That year, superintendent Dr. J.S. Clark was succeeded by his son, Dr. Felton G. Clark, at the School for the Deaf.

In 1978, state of Louisiana merged the Southern School for the Deaf with LSD. Black students were relocated to the Mayflower Campus (North Campus). They occupied this area until 1985, and completion of more of the new buildings on what is now described as the South Campus on Brightside Lane, south of Louisiana State University.

This 116-acre Brightside campus now holds the 22 major working buildings of the school. In 2009, the Louisiana School for the Visually Impaired (LSVI) was relocated here.

== Campus ==
The school has dormitories for students.

== Athletics ==
LSD athletics competes in the LHSAA.

Football and Homecoming was brought back in 2010. Other sports offered include: girls' volleyball, girls' & boys' basketball, girls' & boys track and field, and girls' & boys' powerlifting.

=== Athletic facilities ===
LSD has several gyms, an indoor swimming pool, and a racketball court along with tennis courts and bowling lanes.

== School mascots ==
- Mustangs (1???–1978): the first school mascot.
- Wolves (1938–1978): Southern School for the Deaf mascot.
- War Eagles (1978–present): When LSD and SSD merged, school officials asked the students to vote for a new mascot.

== Superintendents/Directors ==
| Name | Duration | Years in Service |
|---|---|---|
| James Smedley Brown | 1852–1860 | 8 years |
| W.W. McCain | April–October 1860 | 6 months |
| Dr. L.L. Laycock | 1860–1862 | 2 years |
| Adolphins Martin | 1862–1869 | 7 years |
| J.A. McWhorter | 1869–1877 | 8 years |
| Major John Preston (Note: died in office) | 1877–1880 | 3 years |
| Adolphins Martin (Note: reappointed) | 1880–1883 | 3 years |
| R.G. Ferguson | 1883–1884 | 1 year |
| Dr. John Jastremski (Note: longest tenure) | 1884–1904 | 20 years |
| S.T. Walker | 1904–1908 | 4 years |
| S.M. Robertson | 1908–1912 | 4 years |
| W.S. Holmes | 1912–1916 | 4 years |
| Grover C. Huckaby | 1916–1931 | 15 years |
| A.J. Caldwell | 1931–1935 | 4 years |
| Mrs. A.J. Caldwell (Note: acting) | April–May 1935 | 1 month |
| Louis R. Divine | 1935–1940 | 5 years |
| Lang Russell | Nov. 1940–Jan. 1941 | 3 months |
| Spencer Phillips | 1941–1950 | 10 years |
| John Patton | 1950–1961 | 11 years |
| Lillian Jones | Oct. 1961–Feb. 1962 | 4 months |
| Dr. Lloyd Funchess | 1962–1972 | 10 years |
| Dr. Harold Denning | 1972–1973 | 1 year |
| Lt. Col. Jimmie Wax | June–July 1973 | 2 months |
| Elton Lampkin | 1973–1976 | 3 years |
| Ben Phillips | November 1976–June 1977 | 7 months |
| Dr. Harvey J. Corson | 1977–1990 | 13 years |
| Dr. John Radvany | 1990–1993 | 3 years |
| Luther B. Prickett | 1993–2006 | 13 years |
| Kenny David (Note: superintendent title has been dropped and renamed director to the title as of 2006) | 2006–2008 | 2 years (Note: retired as of October 10, 2008) |
| Kevin Lemoine (Note: interim director) | 2008–2009 | 1 year |
| Dr. Donna Alleman | 2009–2010 | 1 year |
| Dr. Monita G. Hara | 2010–2012 | 2 years |
| Dr. Nancy Benham | 2012–2015 | 3 years |
| Dr. Donna Alleman | 2015–2018 | 3 years |
| Ralph Thibodeaux | 2019 | 1 year |
| Pat Cooper | 2018–2019 | 2 years |
| Ernest E. Garrett, III | 2019–2022 | 3 years |
| Katherine Granier | 2022–2023 | 1 year |
| Dr. David Martin | 2023–present | |
