= Helen J. Claytor =

American civil rights activist (1907–2005)

Helen Jackson Claytor
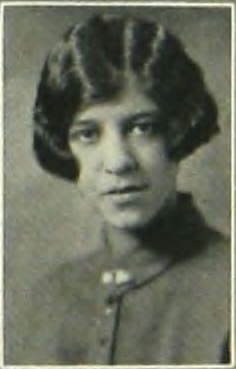
- 1928 University of Minnesota yearbook portrait
- Born: Helen Natalie Jackson; April 12, 1907; Minneapolis, Minnesota, U.S.
- Died: May 10, 2005 (aged 98); Grand Rapids, Michigan, U.S.
- Other name: Helen Jackson Wilkins
- Education: University of Minnesota
- Spouses: Earl Wilkins (m. 1930; died 1941); Robert Claytor (m. 1943; died 1989)
- Children: 3, including Roger Wilkins
- Relatives: Marvel Cooke (sister); Roy Wilkins (brother-in-law)

Helen Jackson Claytor (born Helen Natalie Jackson, formerly Wilkins; April 12, 1907 – May 10, 2005) was an American racial justice activist and YWCA leader. Claytor served on the YWCA national board for decades, developing an explicitly racial justice-focused mission for the organization and serving as its president for 6 years.

Claytor was involved in municipal policy in her longtime home of Grand Rapids, Michigan, where she contributed to the founding of the city's Human Relations Commission. Claytor was inducted into the Michigan Women's Hall of Fame in 1984.

== Early life and education ==
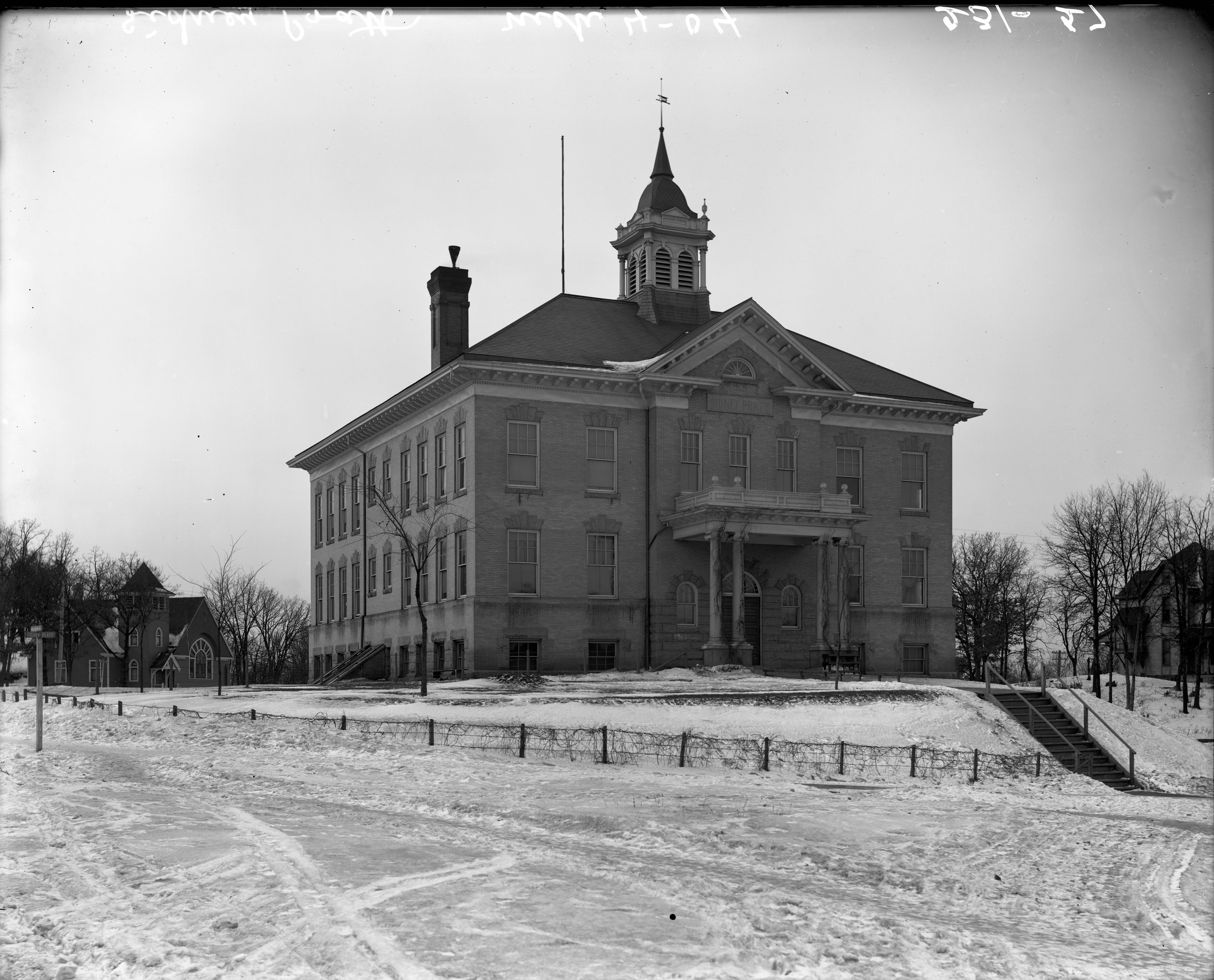
Helen Natalie Jackson and her sisters were the first Black students at Pratt Elementary School (pictured in 1904) when they moved to Minneapolis' Prospect Park neighborhood in 1908

Helen Natalie Jackson was born in Minneapolis on April 12, 1907, the third of four daughters of Madison Jackson and Amy Wood Jackson. Her parents met in South Dakota, where Amy was working as a school teacher and Madison was traveling as a Pullman porter. Madison was a graduate of the Ohio State University School of Law, who became the first Black person admitted to the South Dakota bar association. Madison was unable to build a law practice in South Dakota despite his qualifications, and began working as a Pullman porter.

Jackson, along with her sisters Marvel and Zelma, enjoyed a middle-class upbringing in the Prospect Park neighborhood of Minneapolis, near the University of Minnesota. Her father built a 2 1/2-story brick house on Hamline Avenue (now Franklin Avenue), which still stands as of 2015. The family were the first Black residents of Prospect Park when they moved there in 1908, and the three sisters were the first Black students of Pratt Elementary School.

When the family moved to Prospect Park, they were subjected to opposition from neighbors, which increased in 1909 when the Jackson family hosted another Black family who were in the process of moving in to the neighborhood. In October 1909, a group of 125 white residents gathered and gave speeches stating that neither family were welcome in the neighborhood. The group, organized as the Prospect Park Improvement Association, vowed to take legal action to prevent the two families from staying. The PPIA's efforts towards the two families were unsuccessful, but the rise of exclusionary covenants in the 1910s and 1920s ensured that housing discrimination remained present in the Twin Cities.

Jackson became associated with the Young Women's Christian Association at an early age, beginning with the YWCA Girl Reserves. She studied education at the University of Minnesota, and graduated in 1928 as the valedictorian of her class and a member of Phi Beta Kappa. Jackson had hoped to pursue a career as a teacher, but found few opportunities in the field.

== Initial work with the YWCA ==
Jackson was engaged to University of Minnesota journalism student Earl Wilkins around the time of their graduation in 1928. Wilkins, the editor of brother of fellow journalist Roy Wilkins, was the editor of the short-lived but influential weekly newspaper The St. Paul Echo. The couple agreed to postpone their wedding for two years at the urge of Jackson's mother, and they were married in Chicago in August 1930.

Helen Wilkins was unable to find employment as a teacher, even with her academic accomplishments, and returned to the YWCA. She was hired for a staff position with the Girl Reserves in the YWCA branch in Trenton, New Jersey after her graduation, and after her marriage moved to the YWCA branch in Kansas City, Missouri, where Earl was working for The Call. Wilkins' initial work with the YWCA occurred as Black membership in branches across the country grew rapidly, and the 1931 death of YWCA leader Juliette Derricotte forced the organization to confront the issue of racial segregation.

Helen and Earl Wilkins had one child, Roger Wilkins, who was born in Kansas City in 1932. Earl Wilkins suffered health issues throughout the 1930s, and he died in 1941 of tuberculosis. Helen and Earl had planned to move to New York City before Earl's death, as members of both of their families were living in Harlem. Helen took a job with the YWCA national organization in New York City as its secretary of interracial education in 1941, moving to an apartment at 555 Edgecombe Avenue in Harlem.

As the YWCA's secretary of interracial education, Wilkins co-authored a 1944 report on segregation in YWCA branches, titled Interracial Practices in Community YWCAs. Wilkins and her colleague Juliet Bell surveyed local branches to collect statistics, initially with a mandate to "gather interracial experiences." Their project expanded to include a series of 35 recommendations for desegregating local branches and programs, which were ultimately included in the national organization's 1946 charter revision. The revised charter, titled the "Interracial Charter," represented a significant change in the national YWCA's policies and governance, although progress towards integration took decades for some local branches.

== YWCA work and politics in Michigan ==
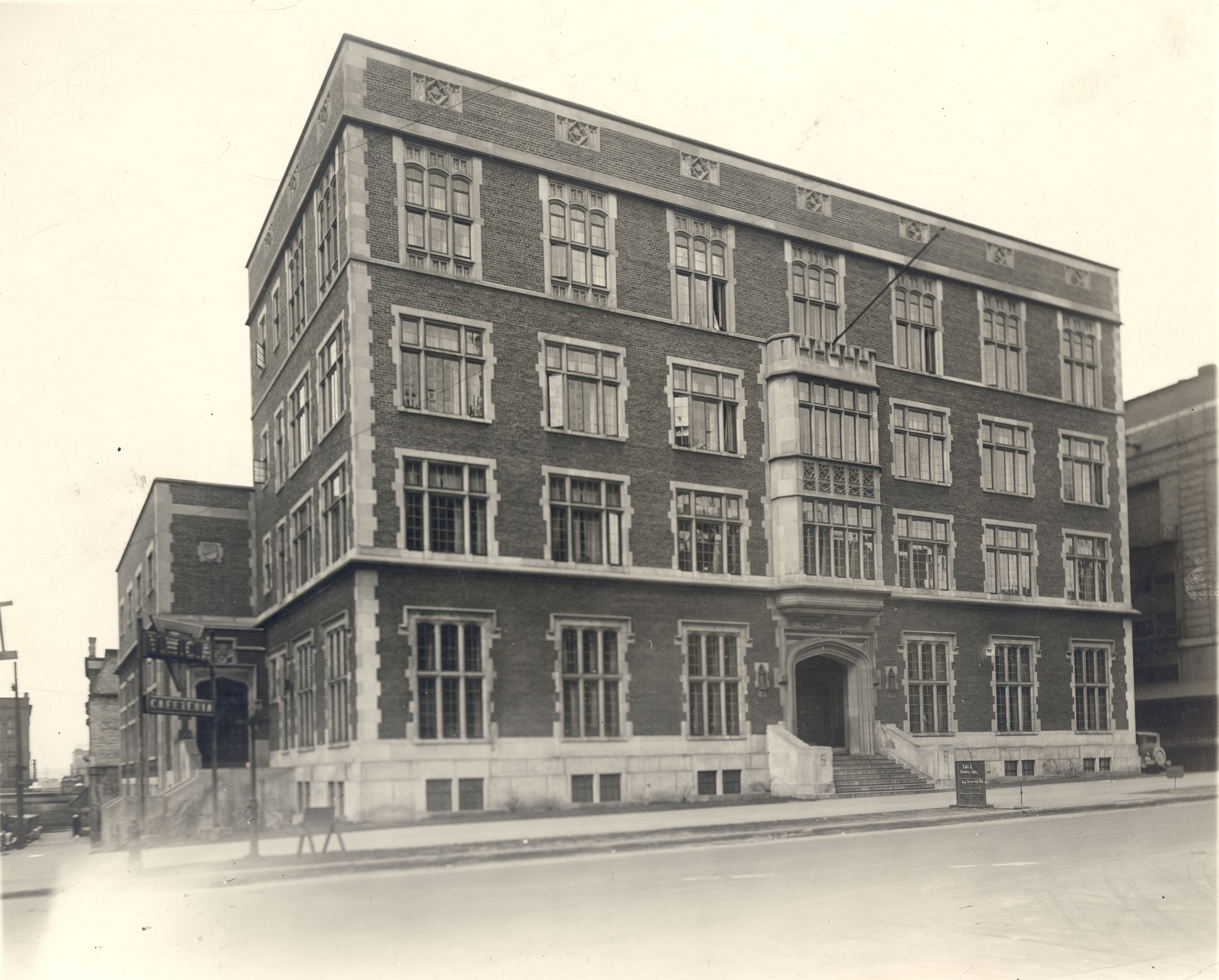
The Grand Rapids, Michigan YWCA, photographed in 1928

Wilkins' work for the YWCA brought her to Grand Rapids, Michigan in 1942, where she mediated a meeting about integration at the local YWCA branch. The meeting included a group of community leaders, including Dr. Robert W. Claytor, a family physician who had practiced in Grand Rapids since 1936. Wilkins and Claytor remained in contact, and they were married in 1943.

Helen Jackson Claytor moved to Grand Rapids in 1944, to a house in the suburban Creston neighborhood in the North End of Grand Rapids. Claytor recalled that she and her husband were only able to purchase their house in an otherwise all-white neighborhood by bypassing local real estate agents. In a 2013 book, historian Todd E. Robinson found that her family was one of only five Black families able to purchase houses in suburban Grand Rapids neighborhoods by the late 1940s. After completing her report on race relations for the national YWCA, Claytor resigned her staff position, but remained active in YWCA business at the local and national level.

Claytor was elected to the Grand Rapids YWCA board of directors within a year of moving to the city, and became its president in 1949. Her work with the national YWCA continued, and she was elected to the YWCA national board in 1946. Claytor also became active in the Grand Rapids chapters of the National Urban League and the NAACP, and worked to coordinate the organizations' activities. Claytor advocated for the creation of the city's Human Relations Commission through participation in multiple study committees over the course of the early 1950s.

== National YWCA leadership and later life ==
Claytor's work with the national board of the YWCA culminated in 1967 with her appointment as the organization's president. She was the first Black president of the YWCA, and continued the national organization's work to compel local branches to integrate their facilities and programs. At the YWCA USA convention in Houston in 1970, the organization adopted a statement of "One Imperative," explicitly defining its goal as "the elimination of racism wherever it exists and by any means necessary."

Claytor was awarded an honorary Doctor of Humanities degree by Eastern Michigan University in 1968, and received an Outstanding Achievement Award from the University of Minnesota the same year. Claytor served as the YWCA's national president until 1973. In 1984, Claytor was inducted into the Michigan Women's Hall of Fame.

Claytor died of congestive heart failure in Grand Rapids on May 10, 2005, at the age of 98.

== Personal life ==
Claytor was a lifelong member of the Episcopal Church. She was a member of St. Philip’s Episcopal Church in Grand Rapids for 6 decades, and served in leadership positions in the Episcopal Diocese of Western Michigan.

== Legacy ==
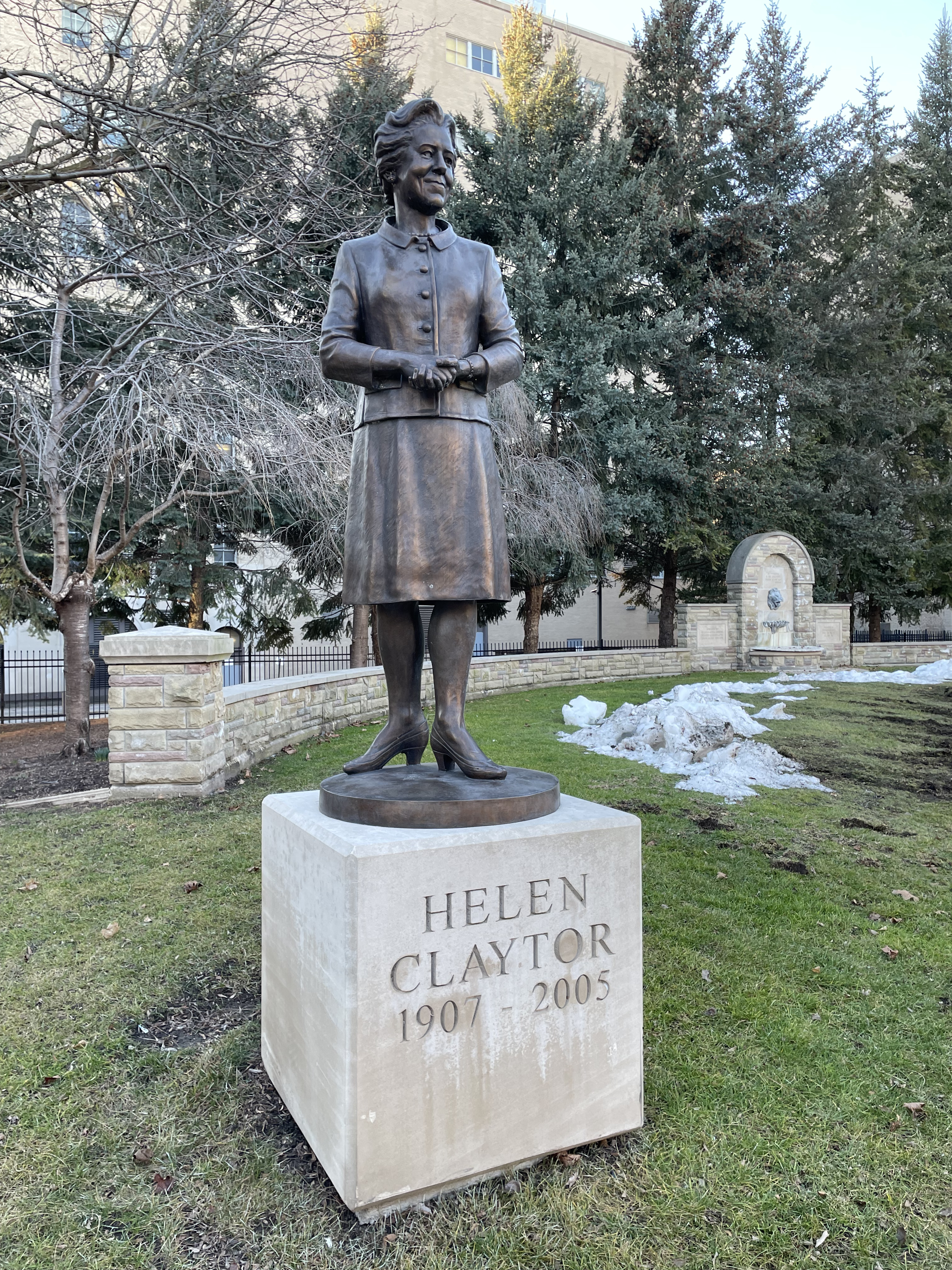
2014 statue of Claytor at Grand Rapids Community College

A statue of Claytor by Jay Hall Carpenter was dedicated in 2014 on the Grand Rapids Community College campus in downtown Grand Rapids. The statue was commissioned as part of the Grand Rapids Community Legends project, led by the family of West Michigan businessman Peter Secchia.

The American Foursquare-style Jackson family home in Minneapolis is listed as a contributing property to the Prospect Park Residential Historic District, which was added to the National Register of Historic Places in 2015. The Jackson family's experience in Prospect Park was featured in the 2018 Twin Cities PBS documentary Jim Crow of the North, which won an Upper Midwest Emmy Award. Jim Crow of the North examines the history of housing discrimination in Minneapolis, and places the Jackson family's experience at the beginning of a chronology that continues to the present.

The Prospect Park Association, the successor of the Prospect Park Improvement Association that was responsible for intimidating the Jackson family, created The Jackson Family Project in 2019 to honor the family's legacy. The playground at Pratt Elementary School, where Jackson and her sisters attended, was rebuilt in 2019 and named in their honor.

== Publications ==
- Bell, Juliet Ober; Wilkins, Helen J. (1944). Interracial Practices in Community Y.W.C.A.'s: A Study Under the Auspices of the Commission to Gather Interracial Experience. OCLC 1511002.
