= James Brown (footballer, born 1919) =

Scottish footballer

Personal information
- Full name: James Munn Brown
- Date of birth: 5 May 1919
- Place of birth: Kelvin, Scotland
- Date of death: 13 April 2005 (aged 85)
- Place of death: Blairgowrie, Scotland
- Position: Outside left

Youth career
- Victoria Park Amateurs
- 1936–1938: Queen's Park

Senior career*
Years	Team	Apps	(Gls)
1938–1952	Queen's Park	12	(0)

International career
1949	Scotland Amateurs	2	(0)
- * Club domestic league appearances and goals

James Brown (5 May 1919 – 13 April 2005) was a Scottish amateur football outside left who played in the Scottish League for Queen's Park. He was capped by Scotland at amateur level.
