= James Brown (archdeacon of Perth) =

James Brown (1820 – 9 October 1895) was an Anglican priest, most notably Archdeacon of Perth, WA from 1862 until 1888.

Brown was educated at Trinity College, Cambridge and ordained in 1845. After curacies in Lockwood and Narberth he went as a Convict Chaplain to Fremantle in 1853; and Rector of York from 1855 to 1858.
