= Bill Jordan (Australian footballer) =

Australian rules footballer

Personal information
- Full name: Bill Jordan
- Born: 4 November 1906
- Died: 11 November 1995 (aged 89)
- Height: 183 cm (6 ft 0 in)
- Weight: 81 kg (179 lb)

Playing career^{1}
| Years | Club | Games (Goals) |
| 1930 | South Melbourne | 3 (1) |
- ^{1} Playing statistics correct to the end of 1930.

Bill Jordan (4 November 1906 – 11 November 1995) was an Australian rules footballer who played with South Melbourne in the Victorian Football League (VFL).
