= János Tamás =

Hungarian-Swiss composer, conductor and music educator

János Tamás [ˈjaːnoʃ ˈtɒmaːʃ] (24 May 1936 – 14 November 1995) was a Hungarian-Swiss composer, conductor and music educator.

Tamás studied in his home town Budapest. After the Hungarian Revolution of 1956, he fled to Switzerland in 1956 and completed his studies at the Bern and Zurich Conservatories. From 1961, he worked as Solorepetitor at the Zürich Opera House, and from 1963 as First Kapellmeister of the Städtebundtheater Biel-Solothurn. In 1969 he was granted citizenship of Schönenwerd. Tamás worked as a teacher at the Old Cantonal School Aarau from 1971. He also conducted the Orchesterverein Aarau and left behind about 120 compositions.

Tamás died in Aarau at the age of 59.

Tamás' compositional estate is administered by the Paul Sacher Foundation in Basel.
