= Jim Brown Award =

Jim Brown Award may refer to an award given by the:

- Touchdown Club of Columbus, given to the NCAA's top running back
- The National Football League given to the league's annual rushing champion
