= Bill Gnaden =

Australian rules footballer

Personal information
- Full name: William Lindsay Gnaden
- Born: 11 July 1932
- Died: 12 November 1995 (aged 63)
- Original team: Donnybrook
- Height: 180 cm (5 ft 11 in)
- Weight: 73 kg (161 lb)
- Position: Wingman

Playing career^{1}
Years	Club	Games (Goals)
1954	Essendon	2 (0)
- ^{1} Playing statistics correct to the end of 1954.

William Lindsay Gnaden (11 July 1932 – 12 November 1995) was an Australian rules footballer who played with Essendon in the Victorian Football League (VFL). Gnaden later played for Redan and was secretary of the Essendon Past Players Association.
