= Jim Brown (rugby union) =

- Full name: James Brown
- Born: 22 March 1901 Cardiff, Wales
- Died: 30 July 1976 (aged 75) Gabalfa, Wales

Rugby union career
- Position: Forward
International career
Years	Team	Apps	(Points)
1925	Wales	1	(0)

James Brown (22 March 1901 – 30 July 1976) was a Welsh international rugby union player.

A forward, Brown gained a Wales call up during his first season with Cardiff, playing a 1925 Five Nations match against Ireland at Belfast. He didn't feature again for Wales and in 1926 signed with rugby league club Pontypridd.

Brown was a railway worker by profession.

== See also ==
- List of Wales national rugby union players
