= James Browne (priest) =

Archdeacon of Madras (1884–1891)

Rev. James Francis Browne (1836 – 1 August 1902) was an Anglican Archdeacon in British India in the late 19th century.

Browne was the son of Lieut. James Francis Browne R.N. and Jane Elizabeth Bore. He was educated at the London College of Divinity and ordained in 1867. After curacies in Middleton Tyas and Bath he went as a Chaplain to Madras. He served at Cannanore, Secunderabad, Black Town and Bangalore. He was Archdeacon of Madras from 1884 to 1891. Returning to England he was the incumbent in Flax Bourton from 1892 to 1894.

He married Elizabeth Anna Deshon in 1870. He died in August 1902 in Somerset.
