= James Robert Brown =

Canadian philosopher of science

James Robert Brown FRSC
- Born: Montreal, Quebec, Canada
- Other name: Jim Brown
- Spouse: Kathleen Okruhlik

Academic background
- Education: University of Guelph; University of Western Ontario
- Thesis: Models of Rationality and the History of Science (1981)
- Influences: Plato

Academic work
- Discipline: Philosophy
- Sub-discipline: Philosophy of mathematics; philosophy of science
- Institutions: University of Toronto

James Robert Brown FRSC (born 1949) is a Canadian philosopher of science. He is an emeritus professor of philosophy at the University of Toronto. In the philosophy of mathematics, he has advocated mathematical Platonism, visual reasoning, and in the philosophy of science he has defended scientific realism mostly against anti-realist views associated with social constructivism. He has also argued for the socialization of medical research (especially pharmaceutical research). He is largely known for his work on thought experiments.

Elected: Academy of Sciences Leopoldina (Deutsche Akademie der Naturforscher Leopoldina – Nationale Akademie der Wissenschaften) 2004, Royal Society of Canada 2007, Académie Internationale de Philosophie des Sciences 2010.

Brown was born in Montreal, Quebec. He is married to the philosopher Kathleen Okruhlik.

== Books ==
- 1989 The Rational and the Social (Routledge 1989)
- 1991 The Laboratory of the Mind: Thought Experiments in the Natural Sciences (Routledge 1991, second edition 2010)
- 1994 Smoke and Mirrors: How Science Reflects Reality (Routledge 1994)
- 1999 Philosophy of Mathematics: An Introduction to the World of Proofs and Pictures (Routledge 1999, second edition 2008)
- 2001 Who Rules in Science? An Opinionated Guide to the Wars (Harvard 2001)
- 2012 Platonism, Naturalism, and Mathematical Knowledge (Routledge 2012)
- 2017 On Foundations of Seismology: Bringing Idealizations Down to Earth (with M. Slawinski)

Books edited include:

- 2012 Thought Experiments in Philosophy, Science, and the Arts (ed. with M. Frappier and L. Meynell ) (Routledge 2012)
- 2018 The Routledge Companion to Thought Experiments (ed. with M. Stuart and Y. Fehige), (Routledge 2018)
