= James Brown (engraver) =

New Zealand engraver, caricaturist, and drawing tutor

James Brown (c.1819 – 12 September 1877) was a New Zealand engraver, caricaturist and drawing tutor. He was born in Linlithgow, West Lothian, Scotland on c.1819.
