= James Browne (theologian) =

James Browne or Brown (1616–1685) was an English theologian.

== Life ==
Son of a father of the same names, of Mangotsfield, Gloucestershire, he matriculated at Oxford as a student of Oriel College in 1634, and took his B.A. degree in 1638. He then left the university, and is said to have become a chaplain in the parliamentarian army and to have been an eager disputant. On the English Restoration he conformed.

== Works ==
Browne wrote:

- Antichrist in Spirit, a work answered by George Fox in his Great Mystery of the Great Whore, pp. 259, 260, where the author's name is spelt Brown.
- Scripture Redemption freed from Men's Restrictions, 1673; and printed with it:
- The Substance of several Conferences and Disputes … about the Death of our Redeemer.
