= Jamie Allan Brown =

Scottish activist

- Born: 9 June 1987 (age 39); Glasgow, Scotland
- Other names: James Allan Brown, Jamie Brown
- Education: University of St Andrews; University of Strathclyde; University of Vienna
- Occupations: Postgraduate Student, campaigner, activist, representative, former board director
- Known for: Youth Empowerment
- Website: www.jamieallanbrown.com

Jamie Allan Brown (born 9 June 1987), also known as James Allan Brown or Jamie Brown, is a Scottish activist, campaigner, former board director and UNICEF Youth Representative. He is originally from Glasgow, Scotland and is a graduate of the University of Strathclyde and University of Vienna. He is now a postgraduate student at the University of St Andrews studying for a Master of Letters in Museum and Galleries Studies.

At the age of 15 he was appointed a board director at the Glasgow Anti-Racist Alliance, promoting equality and encouraging youth participation across the charity. He was selected by UNICEF to become one of the Youth Representative for the United Kingdom campaigning for the promotion of children and young people's rights and visited Ethiopia on a United Nations field trip. In 2005, during the G8 Gleneagles summit, he co-chaired the young people's alternative the C8 Summit. This engaged 16 young people from different countries to produce a list of idea to improve our world, which were then given to the G8 leaders and presented to the public at the Live Aid concert in Edinburgh, Scotland. In 2006, he was awarded UNICEF's 60th anniversary award by Lord Attenborough, for his promotion of children's rights and youth empowerment activism.

In 2008, he volunteered as an English teacher at a high school in Arad, Romania then travelled across Europe. In 2010, Jamie began an internship at Glasgow Museums, where he co-developed a learning programme teaching English to ESOL students using museums objects. Jamie delivered this programme at the City of Glasgow College, (formerly Glasgow Metropolitan College).

He was later awarded by the Marsh Christian Trust and British Museum Volunteer of the Year 2010 for Scotland Region for his voluntary work with Glasgow Museums. Later that year he was awarded the Institute of Contemporary Scotland's Young Scot of the Year 2010 in recognition of his voluntary work in promoting racial equality, encouraging youth participation and services to Scotland. The award is given annually in memory of one of Scotland's greatest post-war journalists, a former editor of the Herald; Arnold Kemp.

== Education ==
Jamie is currently studying for his postgraduate Master of Letters degree in Museum and Galleries Studies at the University of St Andrews in Fife, Scotland. In July 2011 he graduated from the University of Strathclyde in Glasgow, Scotland with a Bachelor of Arts in Community Education and is aiming to develop a career at an international organisation. In 2009 he attended the University of Vienna Sommerhochschule (SHS), a prestigious course that has an alumnus of influential former students across Europe and the world. Its aim is to educate Europe's future leaders. He graduated with a diploma in European Studies with highest distinction.

== Notable Awards ==
- UNICEF UK 60th Anniversary Award for the promotion of children's rights and youth empowerment activism.
- Marsh Christian Trust and the British Museum Volunteer of the Year 2010 for Scotland Region for Glasgow Museums.
- Institute of Contemporary Scotland's Young Scot of the Year 2010.
