= Charles P. Buchanan =

American manager and publisher

- Born: March 18, 1898; Barbados, British West Indies
- Died: December 13, 1984 (aged 86); New York City, New York, U.S.
- Occupation(s): Manager at Savoy Ballroom, Publisher
- Known for: Managing the Savoy Ballroom, Co-founding Powell-Buchanan Publishing Company
- Spouse(s): Bessie A. Buchanan, Annabelle Buchanan
- Parent(s): Lillian Kachlan and James E. Buchanan

Charles P. Buchanan was a manager at the Savoy Ballroom in Harlem, New York City. During his time as a manager, Buchanan also co-founded the Powell-Buchanan Publishing Company, along with Adam Clayton Powell Jr., with its most notable publication being The People's Voice.

== Early life ==
Charles P. Buchanan was born in Barbados in the British West Indies on March 18, 1898, to Lillian Kachlan and James E. Buchanan. Buchanan immigrated to the Bronx, New York, USA, in 1904 at six years old. He was enrolled in Rhodes Business and Prep School, becoming a real estate broker.

== Career ==
Buchanan is most recognized as the manager and secretary-treasurer of the Savoy Ballroom, serving for 32 years from 1926 to 1958. After the Savoy Ballroom closed its doors, Buchanan returned to a real estate career throughout the early to mid-1960s. Buchanan then pursued the chairman and chairman emeritus role at the United Mutual Life Insurance Company, the only black-operated licensed mutual insurance company chartered in the state of New York.

While occupied, Buchanan found time to be active in organizations around New York. This includes the New York Urban League, the N.A.A.C.P. Legal Defense and Education Fund, as well as the Y.M.C.A. located in Harlem.

== Personal life ==
Buchanan had two wives. His first wife was Bessie A. Buchanan, the first African-American woman to hold a seat in the New York State Legislature when she was elected to the New York State Assembly in 1954. His second wife was Annabelle Buchanan, who survived Buchanan after his death in 1984.

Buchanan died on December 13, 1984, at Columbia Presbyterian Medical Center in New York City, New York, at the age of 86, succumbing to a stroke.
