= James Brown (magician) =

English magician

James Brown is an English magician from Tamworth

James Brown is an English magician, theatrical pickpocket, hypnotist and magic consultant, known for his work in close-up magic, suggestion, misdirection and mind games. He was awarded The Magic Circle Close-up Magician of the Year in 2006 James Brown Magician has also worked as a creative consultant on television productions, including Beyond Magic with DMC, produced for National Geographic, Dynamo Is Dead for SKYTV, and the Channel 4 television series TROY.

Career

James Brown began developing his skills in close-up magic in the early stages of his professional career. He subsequently developed a performance style combining sleight of hand, psychological techniques and theatrical pickpocketing. In 2006, James received the Magic Circle's Close-Up Magician of the Year award. He also placed second in the close-up competition at the 2006 International Magic Convention. His performances have included private functions, weddings, corporate entertainment and cabaret. His theatrical pickpocketing routines involve using misdirection and audience interaction to demonstrate techniques associated with confidence tricks and sleight of hand.

Television and Film Consultancy

In addition to performing, James has worked as a consultant and creative contributor to television productions involving magic and illusion. He was one of the magical consultants for Beyond Magic with DMC, a National Geographic production featuring magician DMC. James contributed to the creation and production of several illusions featured in the programme. He also worked on the Channel 4 television series TROY, providing creative input and specialist magic skills. James was part of the core team that created magic and illusions with Dynamo for his show Dynamo Is Dead for Sky TV as well as provide consultancy for his earlier Beyond Belief series (also for SKY TV). More recently in 2024 James provided extensive pickpocket consultation for Mission Impossible: Dead Reckoning where he choreographed scenes and taught Tom Cruise and Hayley Atwell.

Hypnosis and Psychological Performance

Brown's work has also incorporated hypnotic suggestion and psychological techniques. His interest in hypnosis developed alongside his experience in magic and audience interaction. He has discussed the relationship between misdirection, suggestion, human perception and hypnosis in interviews and at professional events. In an interview published by Cosmic Pancakes in February 2022, James discussed his background in psychiatric nursing, his transition into professional magic and the influence of his experience as a theatrical pickpocket on his approach to hypnosis.

Teaching and instructional work

Alongside his performing career, James has produced instructional material for magicians, particularly concerning close-up magic and theatrical pickpocketing. His work has also included teaching and consultancy relating to performance psychology, hypnosis and audience interaction, notably as a regular speaker at the UK Hypnosis Convention.

Recognition

- 2006: Awarded Close-Up Magician of the Year by The Magic Circle.
- 2006: Second place in the International Magic Convention Close-Up competition.

References

1. Seymour, Andrew (5 December 2023). "James Brown brings the magic to Fagor drinks reception". Catering Insight.
2. Marlowe, Amy (1 February 2022). "James Brown Interview: Magic, Pickpocketing & Hypnosis". Cosmic Pancakes.
3. The Magic Guys (3 December 2024). "Professional Opportunist James Brown! #197". Podcast interview.
4. "James Brown (magician)". Wikipedia. Existing article and historical award information.
