= American–Soviet friendship movement =

The American–Soviet friendship movement arose during the late 1920s and early 1930s among American leftist intellectuals whose goals were to promote the establishment of a joint American–Soviet anti-fascist alliance. From the end of World War II until the collapse of the Soviet Union, the movement focused on promoting friendly relations between the US and USSR by distributing information to the American public regarding daily life in the Soviet Union.

Notable individuals part of the movement include Corliss Lamont, Richard Morford, Rockwell Kent, and Harry Steinmetz.

The movement had an effect in the USSR as well, through programs such as Moscow Mailbag on Radio Moscow.

== See also ==
- National Council of American Soviet Friendship
