= James Brown (artist) =

American painter

James Brown (September 11, 1951 – February 22, 2020) was an American-born painter active in Paris and Oaxaca, Mexico. He was most well known in the 1980s for his rough painterly semi-figurative paintings, bearing affinities to Jean-Michel Basquiat and East Village painting of the time, but with influences from primitive art and classical Western modernism.

== Life and work ==
Born in Los Angeles, California, he received a BFA from Immaculate Heart College, Hollywood. He then spent years in Paris, and attended the École nationale supérieure des Beaux-Arts, Paris, France. He rebelled against the classical training there, which he considered irrelevant, but stayed as he wanted to stay in Paris. Tours of Europe seeing renaissance and especially medieval painting of Italy influenced his work. During the 1980s, his paintings, mixing the modernist tradition of painterly application and adherence to the picture surface with clear influences from tribal art. In the early 1980s, he began exhibiting in New York, and in this decade this work became a hit in the galleries and art press, sharing a look with the Bad Painting and young neo-expressionism of the East Village painters of the time. On 12 September 1987, he married Alexandra Condon, who was studying History of Art at NYU at the time. They had known each other for little more than ten years. Despite some time on the East and West coast of New York, he continued to live in Paris. With the fading of the East Village art scene he had increasingly shown in European galleries, where his work was now seen in the context of a post-war European modernism in the tradition of Jean Dubuffet. James and Alexandra had their first child, Degenhart Maria Grey Brown, on 24 September 1989 in New York. In 1991 their second boy, Cosmas And Damian Maria Todosantos Brown, was born on 6 June in Paris. On 16 April 1993, their daughter was born, Dagmar Maria Jane Brown, in New York. In 1995 he moved out to the valley of Oaxaca (Mexico) with his family, where they lived in a hacienda for nine years. During that time, James Brown continued exhibiting in Europe, the United States and Mexico. He and his wife collaborated with various artists, making rugs in a village in the mountains of Oaxaca. The rugs were made in the traditional Mexican fashion, weaved by hand on large wooden frames. James and Alexandra then decided to start making books with artists, so they started Cape Diem Press. Like the rugs, these books are printed in Oaxaca using old-fashioned and traditional methods. The books are printed in limited editions, and Carpe Diem Press continues to collaborate with artists. In 2004, they moved to the city of Mérida, in the Yucatán. Since then James Brown spent much time in Europe, exhibiting his work in France, Germany, Italy and Holland. He worked mostly in Paris.

His work has taken on several styles over the years but maintains a hand-made look combining concerns of the modernist tradition with motifs and spiritual interests from tribal art. Much of his work is a non-realistic but contains depictions or signs of recognizable faces or objects. More recently he has done more in an abstract mode. However, the line between representation and abstraction is often a difficult one in his work, such as his more recent "Firmament Series" – abstract canvases that can also be read as referring to constellations or stars, or groups of rocks. Besides paintings Brown has also produced sculptures and series of prints at various points in his career, and in the 1990s started to heavily utilize collage. Drawing and other unique works on paper have been important to his artistic development and production. In an Artforum review of a 25-year retrospective, Martha Schwendener noted, "The works range from abstract gouaches to biomorphic and figurative watercolors to collages that update the synthetic Cubist experiments of Picasso and Braque."

The couple died in a car accident in Mexico on February 22, 2020.

== Exhibitions ==
James Brown has shown in many galleries from the early 1980s to the present. He has shown across the United States and Europe, as well as other places in the world, and since 1999 increasingly in Mexico. Several of his prints and paintings are included in the collection of the Museum of Modern Art in New York. Selected shows include:

1983 Tony Shafrazi, "Champions," New York (Group Show with Donald Baechler, James Brown, Jean-Michel Basquiat, Keith Haring, Kenny Scharf, Futura 2000),

1983 Nature Morte, New York

1985 Bruno Bischofberger, Zurich, Switzerland

1986 Leo Castelli, New York, New York

1994 "Terrae Motus" collection, Royal Palace of Caserta

1995 Leo Castelli, February, New York

2001 Pace Prints, February, Catalogue raisonne graphic work. New York

2005 Ex-Escuela Quintana Roo, "James Brown 10 acos en Oaxaca," Mérida, Mexico. (This exhibition traveled internationally)

2007 Galerie Karsten Greve, Paris (Showing his abstract "Firmament Series")

2014 Livingstone Gallery, The Hague (NL)

== Sources ==
- Artnet. James Brown on Artnet.
- Eccher, Danilo (curator). James Brown, Milano : Electa, c1995.
- Katz, Vincent (December 2006). "James Brown at Fisher Landau Center for Art". Art in America. 94 (11).
- Museum of Modern Art. "James Brown" in collection database.
- Studio Raffaelli. James Brown CV, c. 2006.

== Selected publications ==
- Danilo Eccher (curator), James Brown, Milano : Electa, c1995. ISBN 88-435-5286-4 ( A 206-page Catalog of an exhibition held at the Galleria civica di arte contemporanea, Trento, Italy, Apr. 22-June 25, 1995.)
- James Brown, suites 1 : monotypes, collages & lithographies. Paris : Atelier Bordas, c1996. ISBN 2-911035-03-8
- James Brown : opera contro natura Milano : Skira, c2003. Essays by Renato Barilli and Maurizio Sciaccaluga. ISBN 88-8491-604-6
