= Jimmy Brown (cricketer) =

English cricketer

Jimmy Brown (7 February 1864 – 4 December 1916) was an English cricketer. He was a left-handed batsman and a left-arm medium-fast bowler. He was born in Gainford and died in Denmark.

Brown's only County Championship appearance coming in 1890 against Kent. He played one more match during the 1890 season, against a team of touring Australians, and, from 1891 until his final appearance in 1899, he played in miscellaneous matches for Durham, a team still 100 years off achieving first-class status at the time of his first appearance.

Brown also appeared for a South of England team against a group of touring Australians in 1896.

Brown died at the age of 52 in Copenhagen.
