= Ollie Harrington =

American cartoonist (1912–1995)

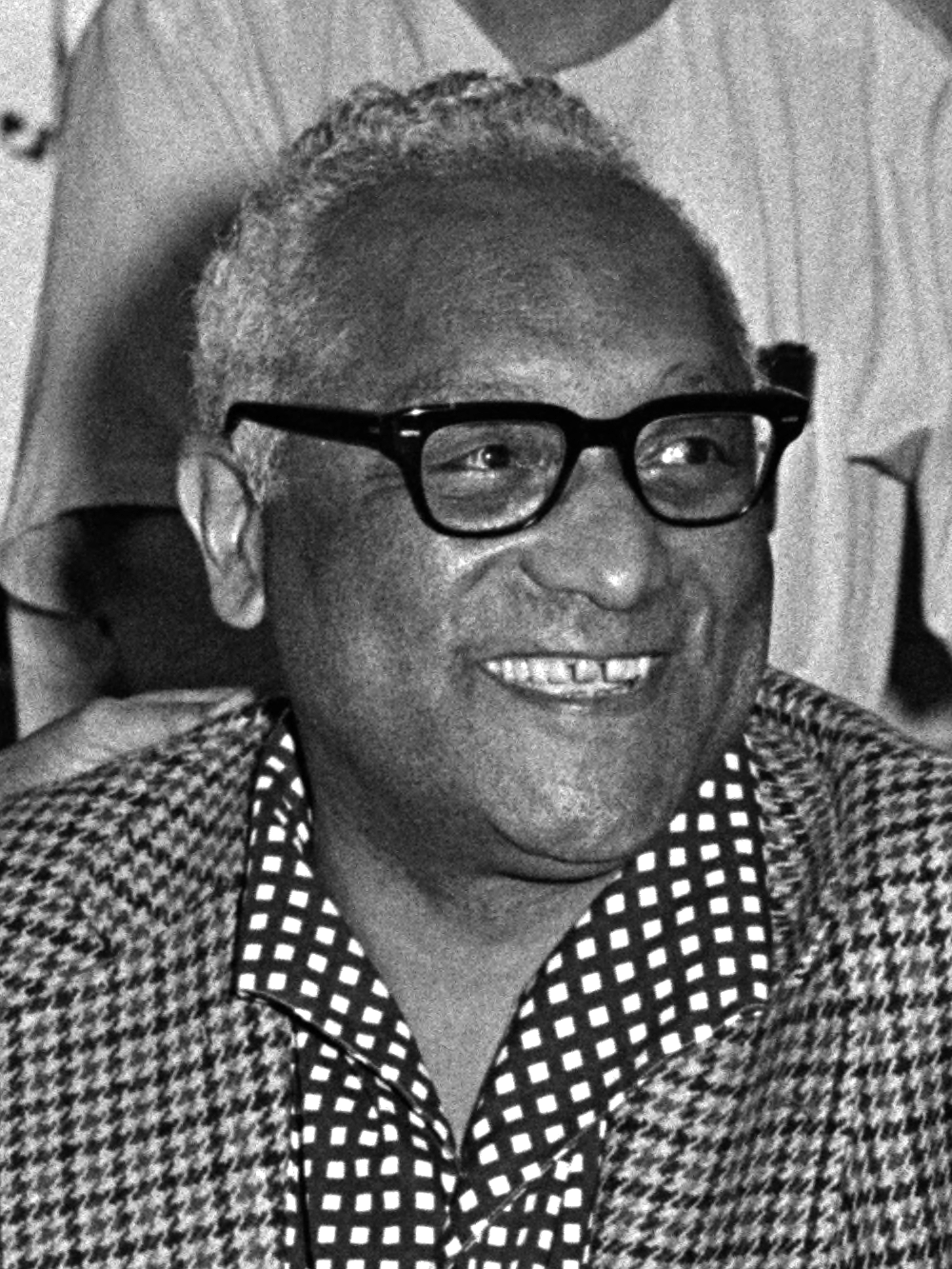
- Harrington in 1972
- Born: Oliver Wendell Harrington; February 14, 1912 Valhalla, New York, U.S.
- Died: November 2, 1995 (aged 83) Berlin, Germany
- Area: Cartoonist
- Notable works: Dark Laughter / Bootsie

Oliver Wendell Harrington (February 14, 1912 – November 2, 1995) was an American cartoonist of multi-ethnic descent and an outspoken advocate against racism and for civil rights in the United States. Langston Hughes called him "America's greatest African-American cartoonist". In 1961, Harrington requested political asylum in East Germany; he lived in Berlin for the last three decades of his life.

== Biography ==
=== Early life and education ===
Born to Herbert and Euzsenie Turat Harrington in Valhalla, New York, Harrington was the oldest of five children. As the son of an African-American father and a Jewish mother from Budapest, Oliver Harrington grew up in a diverse community within the South Bronx. He began cartooning to vent his frustrations about a viciously racist sixth-grade teacher, and graduated from DeWitt Clinton High School in 1929.

He continued his education at the National Academy of Design, and at the Yale School of Fine Arts, where he obtained a Bachelor of Fine Arts degree in 1940. He joined the Communist Party and was in the same party cell as Benjamin J. Davis Jr., Marvel Cooke, and Richard Wright.

=== Cartooning career ===
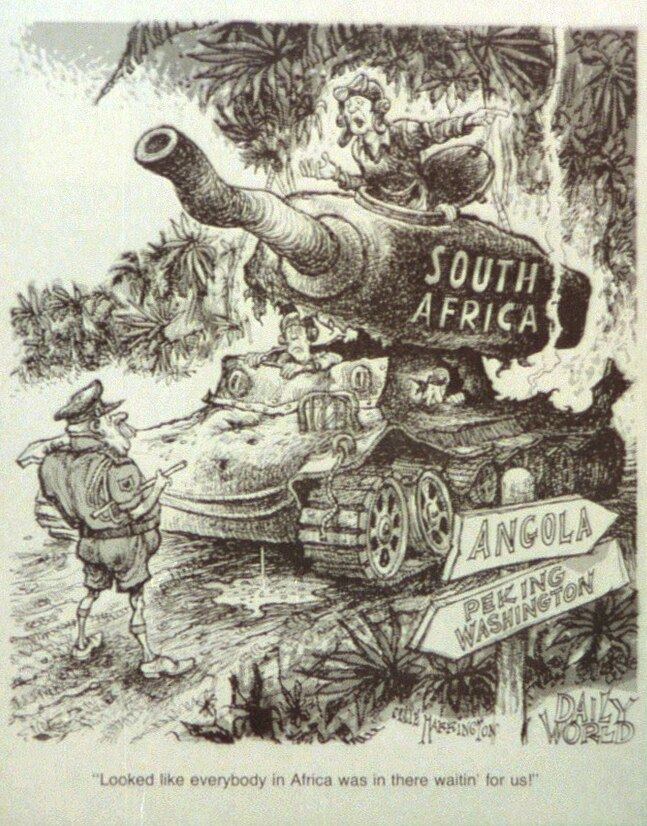
Cartoon about the South African Border War, 1975

Immersing himself in the Harlem Renaissance, Harrington befriended writers such as Arna Bontemps, Rudolph Fisher, Wallace Thurman, and Langston Hughes. Harrington found employment with the Amsterdam News when its city editor, Ted Poston, became aware of the young cartoonist's considerable gifts as a political satirist. In 1935, Harrington created a single-panel cartoon strip, Dark Laughter, for the Amsterdam News. The strip was later retitled Bootsie, after its most famous character, an African-American man dealing with racism in the U.S. Harrington described Bootsie as "a jolly, rather well-fed but soulful character." Harrington contributed cartoons to other Negro newspapers, including the Baltimore Afro-American, Chicago Defender, and Pittsburgh Courier.

In October 1941, he began a weekly adventure comic strip in the Courier called Jive Gray, about an eponymous African-American aviator, and more broadly about the World War II experience from an African American's perspective. The strip continued through 1951, even after Harrington had relocated to Paris. An art historian subsequently noted about Jive Gray that Harrington's "visual style changed and sharpened his criticism, focused at that time on the hypocrisy of US society as it sought to combat fascism abroad while maintaining segregation politics at home."

Following the war, Harrington created illustrations for the NAACP in their public relations campaign on behalf of returning Black veterans. The veterans were facing difficulties adjusting to civilian life, with racial discrimination persisting despite their war service. Unfortunately, Harrington's political views did not comport with those of the NAACP and he left the organization in 1947. He resumed devoting all of his time to politically engaged cartooning, reviving the "Bootsie" series in the Courier.

In the Introduction to the 1958 collection of Bootsie cartoons, Bootsie and Others, Langston Hughes called Harrington a first-rate social satirist and "Negro America's favorite cartoonist".

=== Civil rights ===
Among Harrington's political influences in Harlem were Paul Robeson and Adam Clayton Powell Jr.. In 1942, Harrington was hired as art director for Powell's weekly newspaper, The People's Voice, a self-proclaimed "working-class paper" that was wholly owned and operated by African Americans. In 1943, the Courier sent Harrington to be a war correspondent to Europe and North Africa. He observed first-hand the treatment of African-American soldiers. In Italy, he met Walter White, executive secretary of the NAACP. After the war, White employed Harrington to develop the organization's public relations department, where he became a staunch advocate for civil rights. In that capacity, Harrington published Terror in Tennessee (1946), a controversial exposé of increased lynching in the post-war South. Given the publicity generated by his sensational critique, he was invited to debate with U.S. Attorney General Tom Clark on the topic of "The Struggle for Justice as a World Force." He confronted Clark for the federal government's failure to curb lynching and other racially motivated violence.

=== France ===
In the late 1940s, Harrington's prominence and social activism brought him to the attention of the Federal Bureau of Investigation and the House Un-American Activities Committee. Hoping to avoid further government scrutiny, Harrington moved to Paris in 1951. There he joined a thriving community of African-American expatriate writers and artists, including James Baldwin, Chester Himes, William Gardner Smith, and Richard Wright, the latter of whom became a close friend.

=== Germany ===
In November 1960, when Richard Wright died suddenly of a heart attack in Paris, Harrington suspected his friend's death may have been an assassination perpetrated by the CIA and/or FBI. Harrington believed the U.S. was waging a campaign of harassment against the expatriates.

In August 1961, he traveled to East Berlin to discuss with publishers the possibility of illustrating classic English and American books. From his hotel room, he could see the Berlin Wall being constructed. He later recalled, "I was a virtual prisoner." Nevertheless, he decided in November 1961 to request political asylum in East Germany, and resettled in that country for the duration of its existence. Of his time as an East Berlin resident, he said, "There were great temptations to leave there, but I liked the work." He regularly contributed cartoons to publications such as People's Daily World, Eulenspiegel, and Das Magazin, through which he critiqued U.S. imperialism and racial repression.

== Personal life ==
Harrington was married three times, and had four children. Two daughters are U.S. nationals; a third is a British national. His youngest child, a son, was born after Harrington married his third wife, Helma Richter, a German radio journalist.

== Later years ==
Harrington opted to stay in East Germany for the last decades of his life. He did not visit the U.S. again until 1991, when he was invited by Walter O. Evans, a Detroit surgeon and collector of African-American art. At Detroit's Wayne State University, Harrington delivered a speech entitled "Why I Left America", which summarized his reasons for choosing to remain in exile.

On November 2, 1995, Oliver Harrington died in Berlin. He was 83.

== Awards and recognition ==
In 2026, Harrington was selected for inclusion in the Eisner Hall of Fame.

== Publications ==
- — (1946). Terror in Tennessee: The Truth about the Columbia Outrages. New York: National Committee for Justice in Columbia, Tennessee.
- —; Tarry, Ellen (1955). Hezekiah Horton. Viking Press.
- — (1958). Bootsie and Others: A Selection of Cartoons. New York: Dodd, Mead.
- —; Sterling, Philip; Redding, J. Saunders (1965). Laughing on the Outside: The Intelligent White Reader's Guide to Negro Tales and Humor. New York: Grosset & Dunlap.
- — (1993). Inge, M. Thomas (ed.). Dark Laughter: The Satiric Art of Oliver W. Harrington. Jackson: University Press of Mississippi.
- — (1993). Inge, M. Thomas (ed.). Why I Left America and Other Essays. Jackson: University Press of Mississippi.
- — (2021). Bootsie's War Years: A Dark Laughter Collection. Edited by Nat Gertler. Camarillo, California: About Comics.
- — (2021). Bootsie's Big '50s. Camarillo, California: About Comics.

== Exhibitions ==
- "The Wall in Our Heads: American Artists and the Berlin Wall". Haverford College Cantor Fitzgerald Gallery. October–December 2015.
- "Dark Laughter Revisited: The Life and Times of Ollie Harrington". Billy Ireland Cartoon Library & Museum, Ohio State University. 2021–2022.
- "Ollie Harrington: Expressing the Revolution". Mondays at Beinecke: Douglass, Baldwin, Harrington: The Collections of Walter O. Evans at Beinecke Library. MacMillan Center for International and Area Studies at Yale. January 2024. Curated by Kassidi Jones.
