= James Stephens Brown (Mormon) =

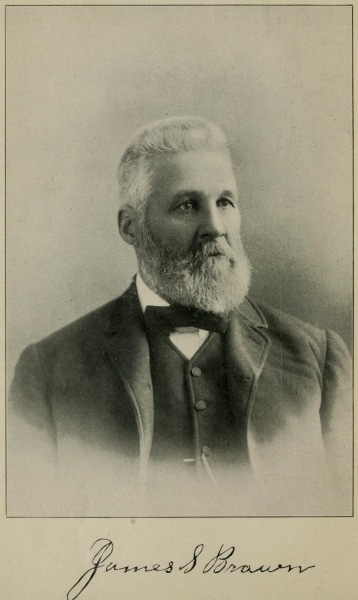
- James Stephens Brown
- Born: July 4, 1828; Davidson County, North Carolina
- Died: March 25, 1902 (aged 73); Salt Lake City, Utah
- Spouse(s): Lydia Jane Tanner, Rebecca Ann McBride, Elia Lester, Elizabeth Clegg
- Children: Deseret, Daniel, Alveretta, Vantile Mac, Burtina, Pauline, Homer, Alphonso, Leo, Zimania Wilford, Elando, Annie Eliza, Frank Lester, Charles, Sarah-Emma, Ada, Mary Lillious, Gaurdello, Mark C., Benjamin Joseph, Louetta, Myrtle J.
- Parent(s): Daniel Brown and Elizabeth Stephens

James Stephens Brown (July 4, 1828 – March 25, 1902) was an American prospector who was influential in the discovery of gold at Sutter's Mill in California. He was also a member of the Mormon Battalion, a missionary, notable writer and speaker, and a prolific husband and father

== Life and career ==
James Stephens Brown was born July 4, 1828, in Davidson County, North Carolina, to Daniel Brown and Elizabeth Stephens.

In 1844 he was converted to "Mormonism" along with the rest of his family, and joined the rest of his coreligionists when they were driven from Illinois. After arriving in Winter Quarters on the Missouri River, he enlisted in the Mormon Battalion as a private. As a member of the Battalion he marched from the Missouri River to California, and was discharged in 1847.

To earn money to get to Salt Lake City, he and other members of the Battalion, including his uncle Captain James Brown and his cousin Jesse Sowell Brown, found employment with John Sutter who owned a mill. It was while working at this mill that James W. Marshall found the first pieces of gold, and Brown, after conducting some rudimentary tests, pronounced "gold, boys, gold!" This was the pronouncement that began the California Gold Rush of 1849.

Upon getting to Utah, he was a prominent speaker, and traveled speaking of his adventures with the Battalion and in California. He also served LDS missions in Tahiti (October 1849–November 1852), England (April 1860-July 1862), the US Territories (October 1869-unknown), the United States (April 1872–unknown), the Navajo Indians (October 1875-unknown), and again to Tahiti (April 1892–July 1893).

In 1898 he was invited to be a guest of honor at the 50th anniversary of the discovery of gold in California celebrations.

== Marriage and children ==
Brown married four wives.

- His first wife was Lybia Jane Tanner.
  - Her children were Lybia J., Rachel Elizabeth, Emeretta, James T., Zina May, August, and Valentine.
- His second wife was Rebecca Ann McBride whom he married in September 1854.
  - Her children were Deseret, Daniel, Alveretta, Vantile Mac, Burtina, Pauline, Homer, and Alphonso.
- His third wife was Elia Lester whom he married January 31, 1863.
  - Her children with him were Leo, Zimania Wilford, Elando, Annie Eliza, Frank Lester, Charles, Sarah-Emma, and Ada.
- His fourth wife was Elizabeth Clegg whom he married on 4 March 1872.
  - Her children were Mary Lillious, Gaurdello, Mark Clegg, Benjamin Joseph, Louetta, and Myrtle Junetta.

== Published works ==
Life of a Pioneer: Being the Autobiography of James S. Brown.

California Gold: an authentic history of the first find
