= Jim Brown (interpreter) =

American diplomat

James W. Brown

Language and Protocol Adviser to the US Ambassador to China
- In office 2005–2014
- President: George Bush; Barack Obama

Personal details
- Born: 1953 (age 72–73)
- Education: Fu-Jen University
- Alma mater: University of San Diego, (China Center Fellow)
- Occupation: Diplomat, Translator, Interpreter
- Nickname: "Jim"

James W. Brown (born 1953) is a retired American diplomat. He served in the United States Foreign Service, the State Department and Defense Department in multiple capacities over the course of forty years. More commonly known simply as “Jim” he has served as interpreter for seven U.S presidents since Jimmy Carter to more recently Donald Trump during his visit to China in November of 2017

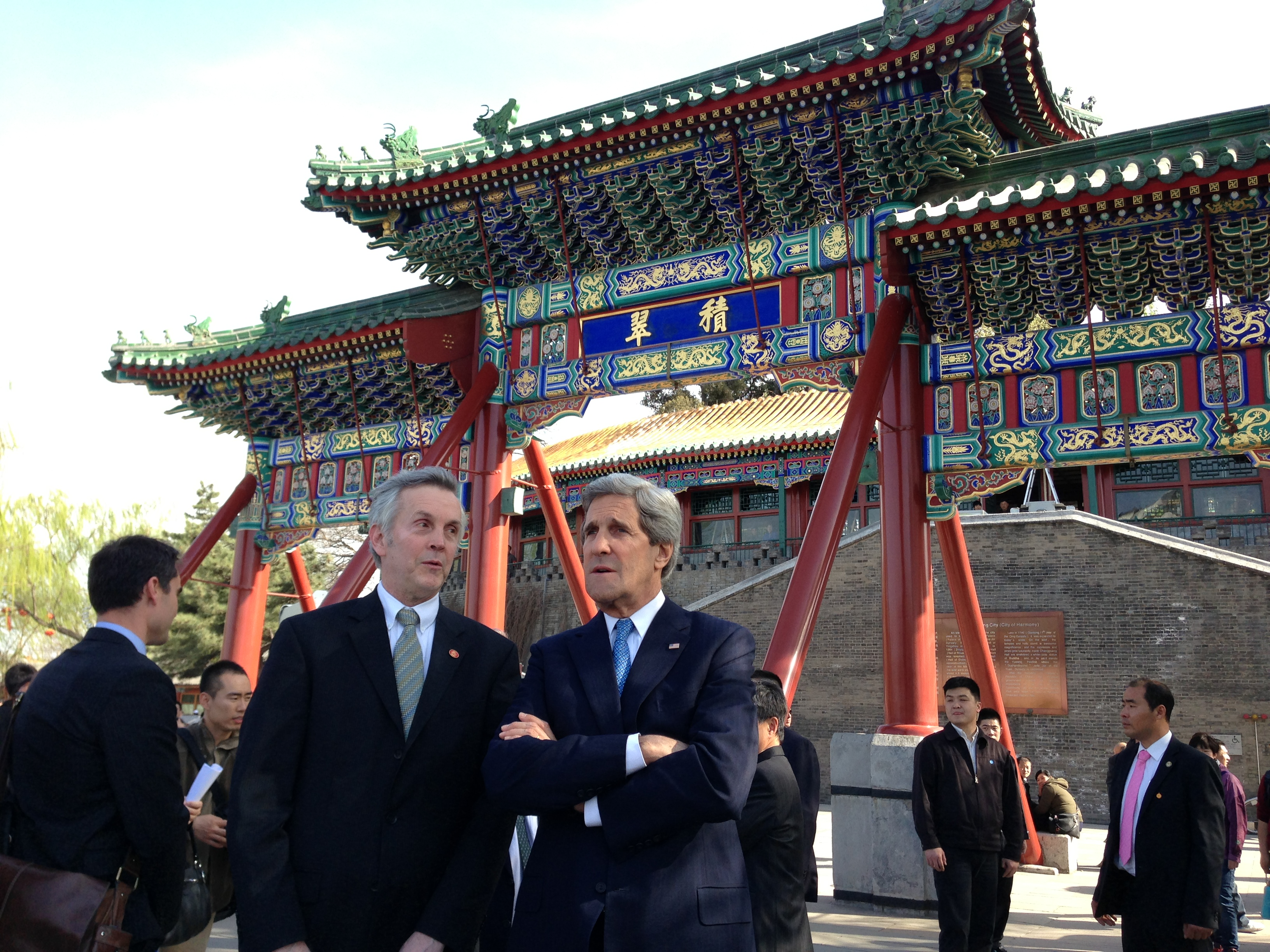
U.S. Secretary of State John Kerry, accompanied by longtime Chinese translator James Brown, stand in front of the South Gate to Beihai Park and look at Bai Ta, or the White Pagoda, at Beihai Park in Beijing, China

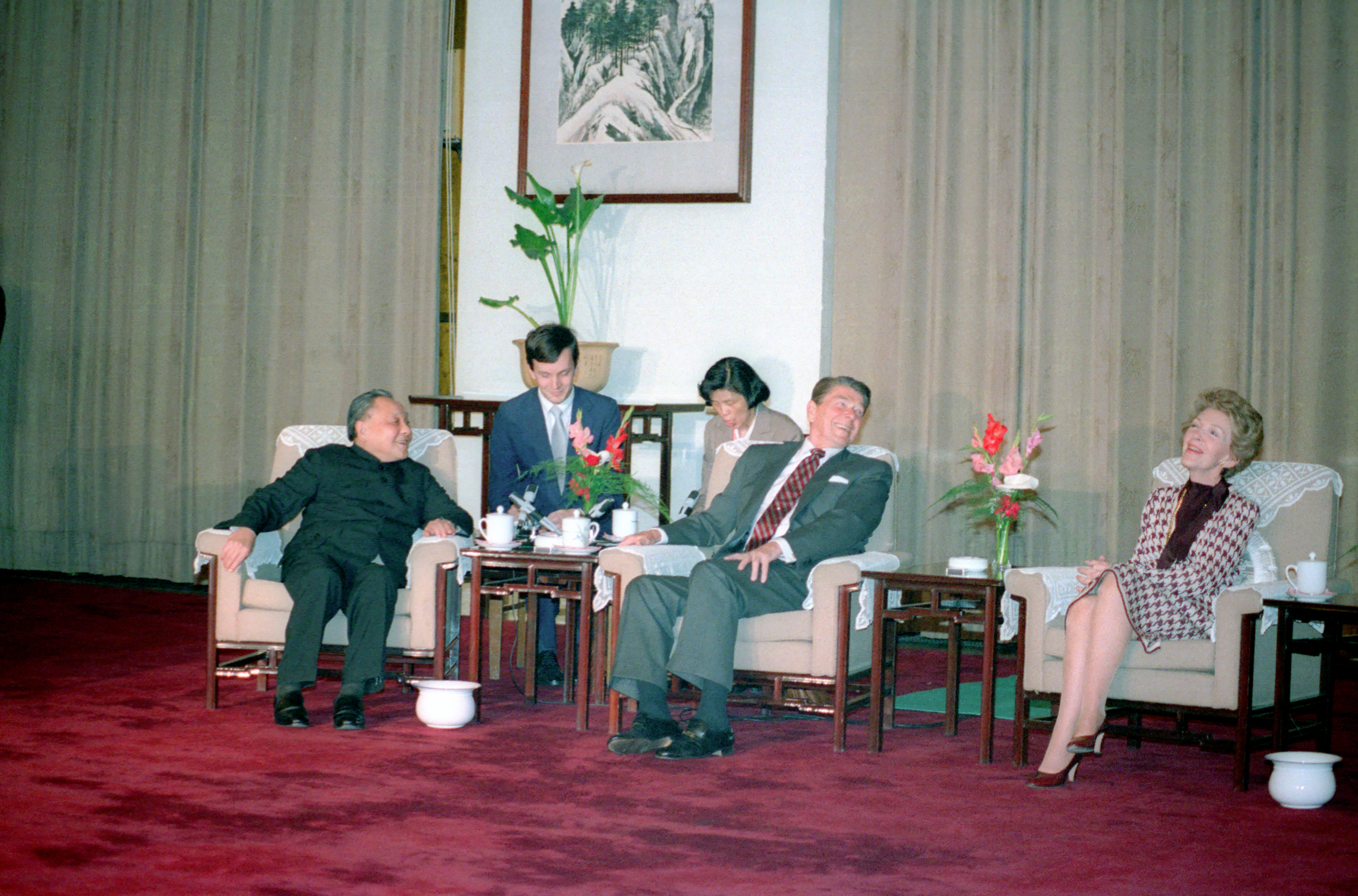
James Brown as interpreter for a meeting between Ronald Reagan and Deng Xiaoping in 1984.

Brown was born in Washington D.C. as the son of a U.S. diplomat, and studied history and international relations at the Fu Jen University in Taiwan before joining Pan-American Airlines in the late 1970s. In 1980, he was hired by the U.S. Department of Defense, and joined the U.S. State Department the following year. Although admitting that he wanted to be a "generalist", the U.S. government considered his proficiency in the Chinese language to be an asset as China reopened its once-closed gate to the world at that time, and assigned Brown to multiple tenures at the U.S. Embassy in Beijing. He retired from the State Department in 2021. In 2021 Jim became a fellow at the University of San Diego’s China Center.

Brown's languages include Cantonese, French, Japanese, and Korean, but is best known for his knowledge of the Mandarin language. Brown remarked that his proficiency in the Chinese language had caught locals off-guard. Brenda Sprague, then the State Department's Director of Language Services, explained that the ability to perform consecutive and simultaneous translation during formal diplomatic and senior-level functions was the highest level of language expertise, but that "At Jim's level, there is only one Jim".
