= Junior 7 =

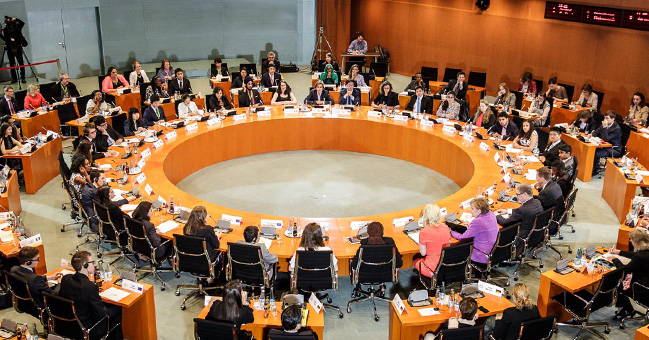
J7 summit participants in discussion with Chancellor Angela Merkel Photo:Bundesregierung/Denzel

Also known as J7 Youth Summit, J7 Summit, J7, Junior 7, (previously J8, J8 Summit). The J7 ("junior 7") Global Citizenship Summit provided young people from around the world with opportunities to learn more about topical global issues, to debate and discuss these issues, and to take their solutions to world leaders at the G7 summit. J7 was a partnership between UNICEF and the country with the presidency of the G7.

Through an international selection process held each year, teams of young people aged 14 to 17 were chosen to put forward their ideas on the same issues to be discussed at that year's G7 summit. First, Delegates were shortlisted from hundreds of thousands of applications, then they were invited to a final selection process held in their own country. The final Successful delegates met at the same time as the G7 to took part in their own ‘Junior’ 7 summit. During the summit they engaged in workshops, roundtable discussions and exercises to help them write a joint communiqué on the G7 agenda issues.

The first J7 (when Russia was part of the group it was called J8) to be held was in 2005 and took place in Edinburgh, on the university campus when the G8 Summit took place at the exclusive Gleneagles Hotel also in Scotland, United Kingdom. At that time the J8 was purely a Morgan Stanley. Although UNICEF held a similar event, named the C8.

At the July 2006 summit held in St Petersburg, Russia eight young people from each of the countries were given a 45-minute audience with all of the G8 leaders for the first time. Russian President Vladimir Putin told the young people, "This G8 will go down in history as the one in which you participated in our joint work. What you have discussed with your peers... will have a big impact on the outcome of our work."

J8 representatives were present for the June 2007 summit in Wismar, Germany, as well as the 2008 summit in Tōyako, Hokkaidō.

Topics at the 2009 J8 in Rome, Italy included: the 2008 financial crisis in the context of child rights, climate change, poverty and development in Africa, and a fourth theme of their choice, education.

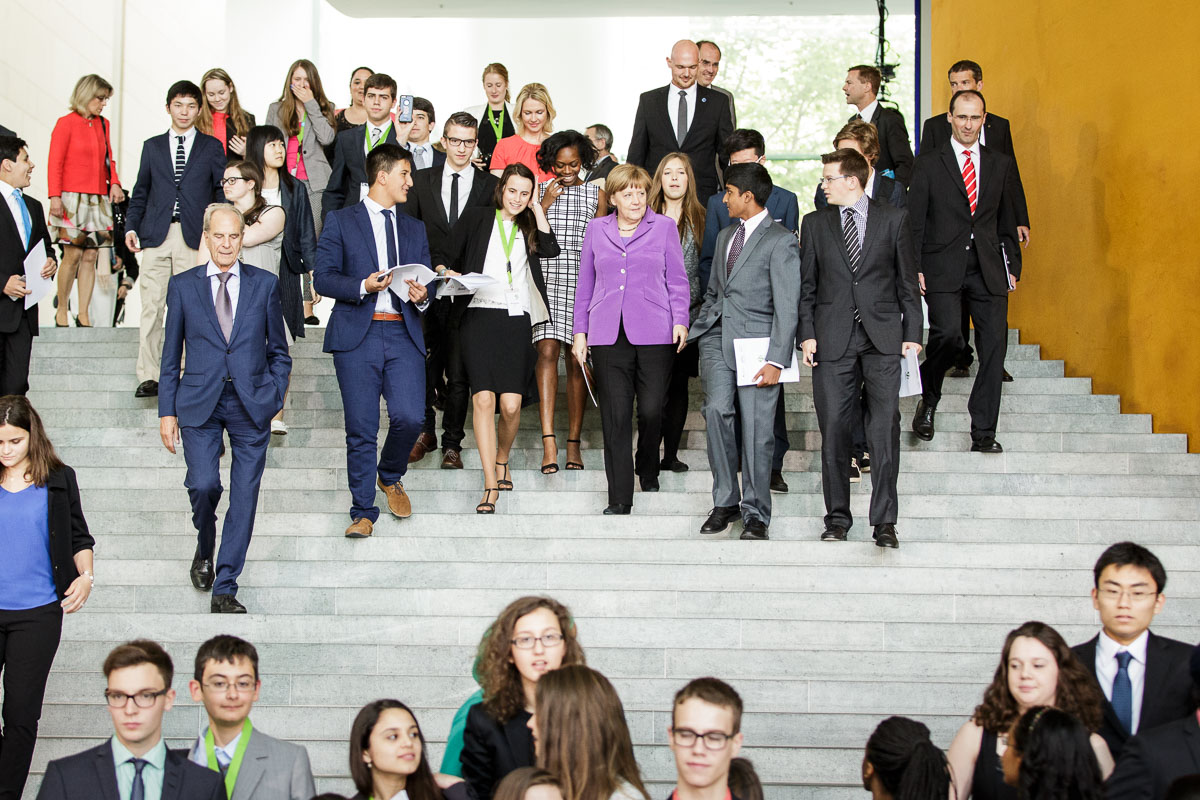
J7 summit 2015 participants with Chancellor Angela Merkel at the Federal Chancellery

A J7 Summit with its new name was held in Berlin in May 2015 with 6 young people from each of the G7 countries selected, as well as 6 from Europe and 5 from Africa. During the summit, the delegates met with diplomats from their own country and with Chancellor Angela Merkel. This summit was a partnership between the German Federal Government, IJAB and UNICEF. Topics were the same as the G7 topics and the summit was held on 6–14 May 2015. A follow-up to this summit will also take place in Berlin in August 2016 with the same delegates hosted by the German Government.

It is confirmed that a J7 Summit will also precede the G7 Summit in Japan in 2016 after delegates from the previous summit in Berlin called on the Japanese Prime Minister to host a summit at their final press conference. This summit in Japan took place on 22–28 April 2016.

As well as the annual competition, J7 is also an education program with resources on global issues. The J7 website (original link no longer works) provides information about all the issues that are on the G7 agenda. The site includes resources for young people and teachers, including fact sheets and lesson plans on relevant topics.

Due to the downsizing of the G8 to the G7 in 2014, the formation of this project also changed. There is currently no public information on this project or its continuation and no further plans.
