= James Smedley Brown =

James Smedley Brown (September 10, 1819 – 1863) was a nineteenth-century American educator of the deaf who is credited with the publication of the first dictionary of American Sign Language. He attended Oberlin College, and died in 1863.

== Career ==
From 1842 to 1845, Brown taught at the Ohio School for the Deaf. He was superintendent at the Indiana School for the Deaf (1845–1852) and the Louisiana School for the Deaf (1853–1860).

== Sign-language dictionaries ==
Brown published A Vocabulary of Mute Signs in 1856, as well as A Dictionary of Signs and of the Language of Action, for the Use of Deaf-Mutes, their Instructors and Friends; and, also, designed to facilitate to members of the Bar, Clergymen, Political Speakers, Lecturers, and to the Pupils of Schools, Academies, and Colleges, The Acquisition of a Natural, Graceful, Distinctive and Life-Like Gesticulation in 1860. Brown's works would be the only reference works on American Sign Language for decades.
