= Jim J. Brown =

Australian rules footballer

Jim Brown

Personal information
- Full name: James John Brown
- Born: 26 March 1925
- Died: 16 November 1995 (aged 70)
- Original team: Meredith
- Height: 187 cm (6 ft 2 in)
- Weight: 85 kg (187 lb)

Playing career^{1}
Years	Club	Games (Goals)
1946	Geelong	5 (0)
- ^{1} Playing statistics correct to the end of 1946.

James John Brown (26 March 1925 – 16 November 1995) was an Australian rules footballer who played with Geelong in the Victorian Football League (VFL).
