= Death and state funeral of Jimmy Carter =

2025 funeral of the 39th U.S. president

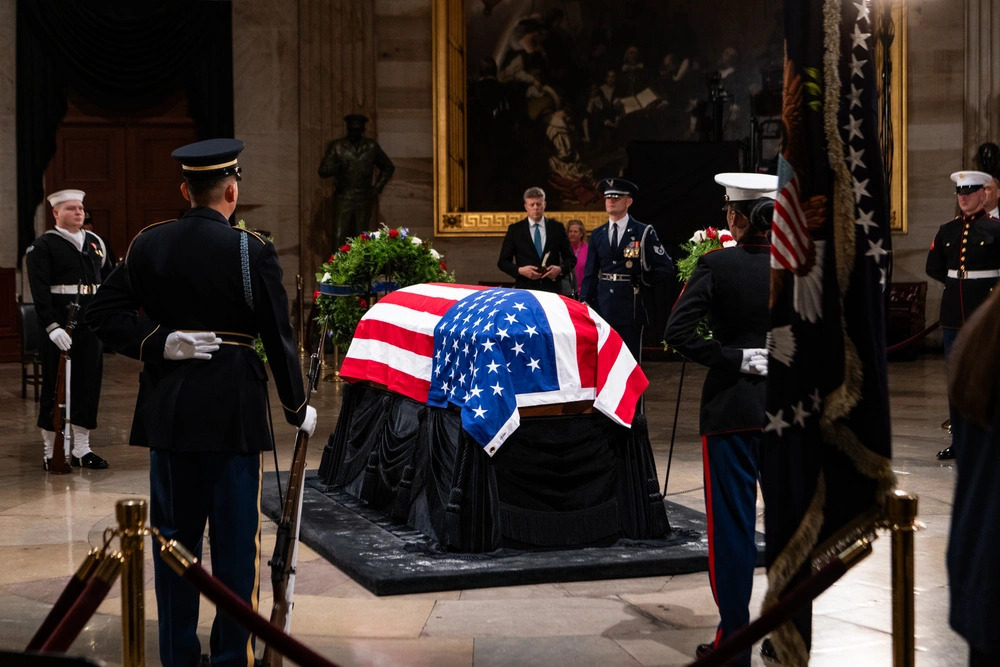
- Carter lies in state in the U.S. Capitol rotunda
- Date: January 4–9, 2025 (state funeral); December 29, 2024 – January 29, 2025 (mourning period)
- Location: Washington, D.C.
- Type: State funeral
- Organized by: JTF-NCR; U.S. Department of Defense
- Participants: Bill Clinton; George W. Bush; Barack Obama; Donald Trump; Joe Biden; Kamala Harris; Members of the 119th Congress
- Burial: Jimmy Carter House
- Lying in state: U.S. Capitol
- Website: jimmycartertribute.org

On December 29, 2024, Jimmy Carter, the 39th president of the United States, the 76th governor of Georgia, and recipient of the 2002 Nobel Peace Prize for his post-presidential work, died of natural causes at his home in Plains, Georgia, after nearly two years in hospice care. At the age of 100 years, 89 days, Carter was the longest-lived U.S. president in history and the first centenarian president.

Condolences were sent by leaders from around the world, and an extensive funeral schedule was set forth, including a period of Carter lying in state at the United States Capitol, and a national day of mourning and federal holiday declared by President Joe Biden to be held on January 9, 2025, the day of Carter's funeral service.

== Background ==
After several years dealing with various health issues and declining physical ability, particularly being diagnosed with melanoma that metastasized to his brain and liver, the Carter Center announced on February 18, 2023, that Carter was staying at home to "receive hospice care instead of additional medical intervention". Sources noted that hospice care medically means that the patient's life expectancy is no more than six months, and patients in hospice care typically die within several weeks. The following week after the announcement, it was reported that Carter's close family members had come to his home in Plains, Georgia, to spend his final days with him, although local news reported four months later that Carter remained "in great spirits, visiting with family and still enjoying ice cream".

In late August 2023, Carter's grandson Jason Carter provided an update on Carter's health, noting that his grandfather was "in the final chapter" of his life, and in mid-September, Jason further reported that both Carter and former first lady Rosalynn Carter were "coming to the end", though both were well enough to be taken for a drive through the Plains Peanut Festival on September 23. On November 17, 2023, it was announced that his wife Rosalynn would also be entering hospice care. She died two days later, at the age of 96, and Carter attended her funeral. Carter's final public appearance was on October 1, 2024, his 100th birthday, when he viewed a military flyover. However, he did vote for Kamala Harris on October 16.

Carter had been the earliest-serving living former president for 18 years, since the death of Gerald Ford in 2006. In September 2012, he surpassed Herbert Hoover as the president with the longest retirement. Seven years later, on March 22, 2019, he became the nation's longest-lived president, when he surpassed the lifespan of George H. W. Bush, who was 94 years, 171 days of age when Bush died in November 2018; both men were born in 1924. He noted how difficult it felt to reach his nineties, the former president saying in a 2019 interview with People that he never expected to live as long as he had, claiming his secret to a long life was a good marriage.

On December 29, 2024, Carter died at his home in Plains, Georgia. Carter's son, James E. Carter III, said he died at around 3:45 p.m. EST. Carter was the first Democratic president to die since Lyndon B. Johnson, who died in 1973.

== Reactions ==
President Joe Biden delivering remarks about Carter's death and legacy

President Joe Biden stated that "America and the world lost an extraordinary leader, statesman and humanitarian" and in an address from Saint Croix in the United States Virgin Islands, Biden said that Carter was a "remarkable leader". President-elect and former president Donald Trump said Carter "did everything in his power to improve the lives of all Americans." Former presidents Barack Obama, George W. Bush, and Bill Clinton paid tribute to Carter, as did former vice president Al Gore. Senator Bernie Sanders, for whom Carter voted during the 2016 Democratic Party presidential primaries, stated that "Jimmy Carter, both for what he did as president and in his later years, will be remembered as a decent, honest and down-to-earth man." Across Georgia's political landscape, his death was also mourned by Governor Brian Kemp, former U.S. Senator Kelly Loeffler, the state's congressional delegation and many others by both Republicans and Democrats in Georgia. Delta Air Lines, operating its largest hub in Atlanta, also reacted to Carter's death, lauding his past life.

Internationally, Carter's death was mourned by Brazilian president Luiz Inácio Lula da Silva, King Charles III of the United Kingdom and other Commonwealth realms, British prime minister Keir Starmer, Italian president Sergio Mattarella, Cuban president Miguel Díaz-Canel, Egyptian president Abdel Fattah el-Sisi, French president Emmanuel Macron, German chancellor Olaf Scholz, Bangladeshi chief advisor Muhammad Yunus, Hungarian prime minister Viktor Orbán, Israeli president Isaac Herzog, Israeli prime minister Benjamin Netanyahu, Japanese prime minister Shigeru Ishiba, Panamanian president José Raúl Mulino, Ukrainian president Volodymyr Zelenskyy, Pope Francis, Canadian prime minister Justin Trudeau, Indian prime minister Narendra Modi, Australian prime minister Anthony Albanese, Chinese president Xi Jinping, Dutch prime minister Dick Schoof, King Willem-Alexander of the Netherlands, European Council president António Costa, Maldivian president Mohamed Muizzu, Palestinian president Mahmoud Abbas, Philippine president Bongbong Marcos, Tanzanian president Samia Suluhu Hassan, and Vietnamese president Lương Cường.

Unlike other reactions, Iranian state television's coverage of Carter's death characterized him as the "architect of economic sanctions" and remarked on his "failure" to "properly deal with Iran". A moment of silence was held for Carter at the United Nations Security Council on December 30.

== Initial activities ==
=== National mourning ===
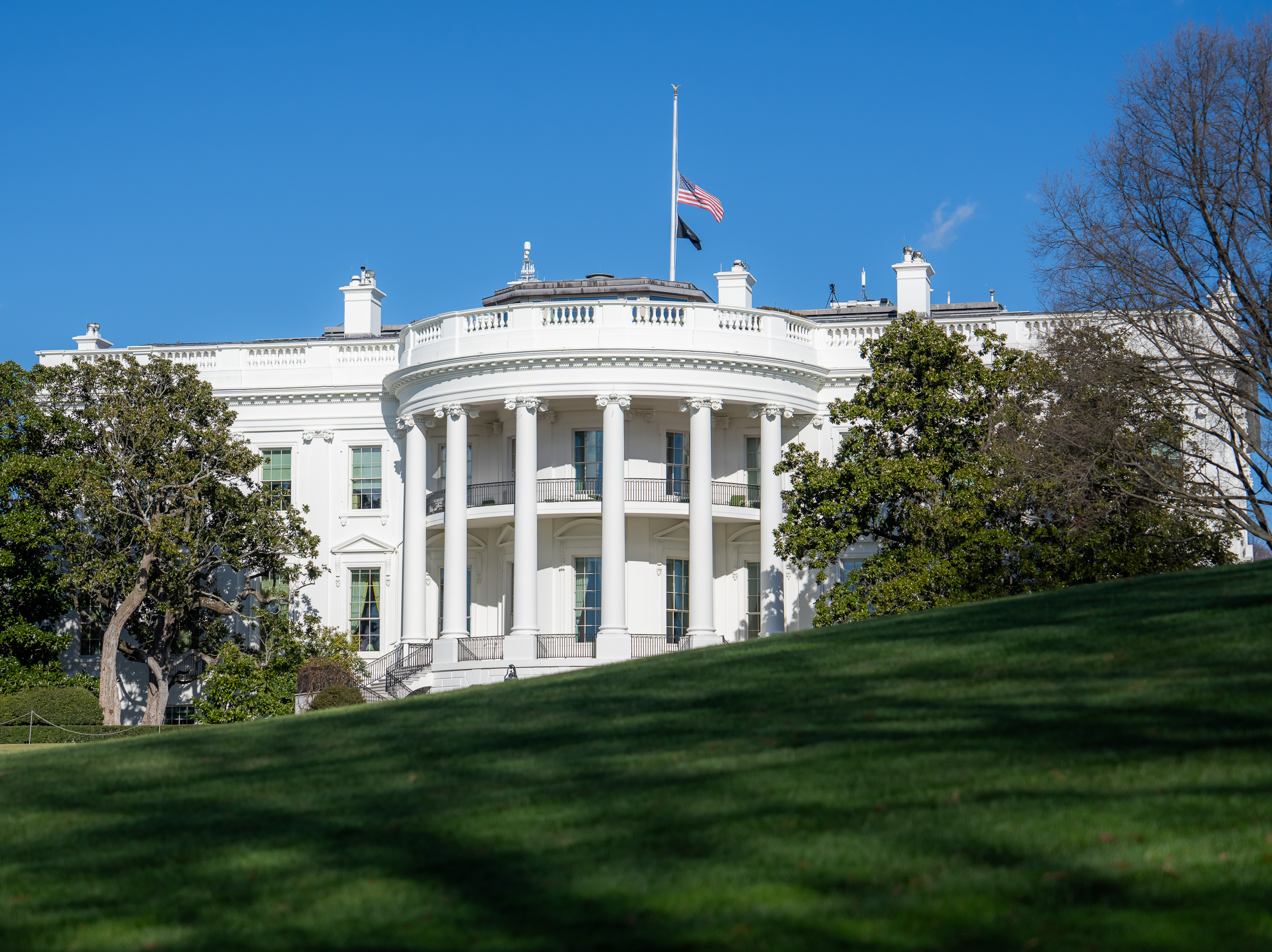
The United States flag at half-staff over the White House, December 30, 2024

President Biden ordered U.S. flags to be lowered to half-staff for thirty days (until January 28) in accordance with federal law, including at president-elect Donald Trump's inauguration on January 20. Even so, on January 15, House Speaker Mike Johnson announced that the flag would be flown at full-staff at the Capitol on Inauguration Day, and returned to half-staff the following day to continue the thirty day salute to the late President Carter. Following the president's lead, state governors issued executive orders honoring Carter and lowering flags in their states to half-staff, with some states following Speaker Johnson's lead in raising their flags to full-staff on the day of Trump's inauguration. Biden declared a national day of mourning and federal holiday for January 9, the day of Carter's funeral service.

Black mourning drapes were placed over portraits of Carter at Smithsonian Institution facilities, the White House, the Georgia State Capitol, the Jimmy Carter National Historical Park, and other official sites.

=== Gun salutes and memorial musters ===
United States Armed Forces installations and ships at sea fired continuous artillery volleys at 30-minute intervals from sunrise to sunset on December 30, as prescribed by military regulation following the death of a former president.

=== Prayer services and pastoral statements ===
At Maranatha Baptist Church in Plains, Georgia, where Carter was a member, a memorial prayer vigil was held on December 30. Rear Admiral Margaret Kibben, the chaplain of the U.S. House of Representatives, led the chamber in prayer for Carter on December 31. The First Baptist Church of the City of Washington, D.C.—where Carter taught Sunday school during his presidency—announced plans for a prayer service in Carter's memory.

The Council of Bishops of the United Methodist Church enacted a resolution recalling Carter as a "devoted Christian who embodied Jesus' teachings". The First Presidency of the Church of Jesus Christ of Latter-day Saints released a statement declaring that Carter "embraced the Savior's admonition" and noting it would pray "that the Carter family may feel comfort and peace". On behalf of Pope Francis, the Secretary of the Apostolic See, Pietro Parolin, announced that "the Holy Father commends him [Carter] to the infinite mercies of almighty God and prays for the consolation of all who mourn his loss".

== Memorial service and state funeral ==
=== Stage one: Carter Presidential Center ===
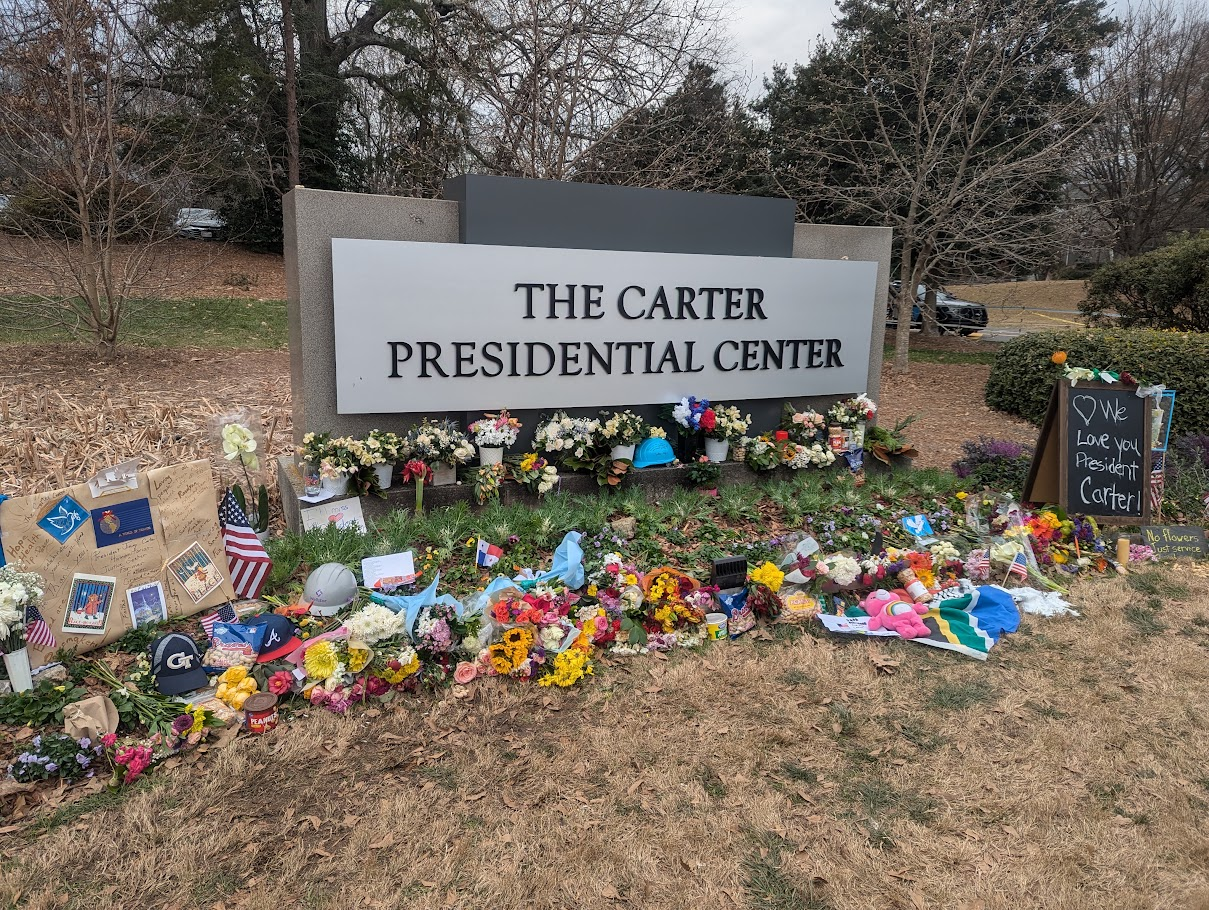
The entrance to the Carter Presidential Center following Carter's death

On the morning of January 4, 2025, Carter's remains were taken by motorcade to Atlanta from Phoebe Sumter Medical Center in Americus, Georgia. The motorcade traveled to the Jimmy Carter National Historical Park in Plains and stopped at the house Carter and his wife Rosalynn built and inhabited since 1962. It then proceeded to his boyhood home in nearby Archery, where the National Park Service saluted him, and the farm's bell rang 39 times in recognition of him being the 39th U.S. President. It then made its way to Atlanta, where his service as governor of Georgia was honored at the Georgia State Capitol with a salute by the Georgia State Patrol and a moment of silence led by Georgia Governor Brian Kemp, Lieutenant Governor Burt Jones, Atlanta Mayor Andre Dickens, and members of the Georgia General Assembly.

Carter's remains were then taken to the Carter Center, where his casket was received with ceremony by military pallbearers. The ceremony included a performance, "Battle Hymn of the Republic" by the Morehouse College Glee Club, and remarks by Carter's son Chip and grandson Jason. It also included the governor, mayor, Carter Center CEO, and the library director jointly laying two wreaths. He lay in repose at the Carter Center from January 4 to 7.

=== Stage two: Washington ===
==== Return to Washington and funeral procession ====
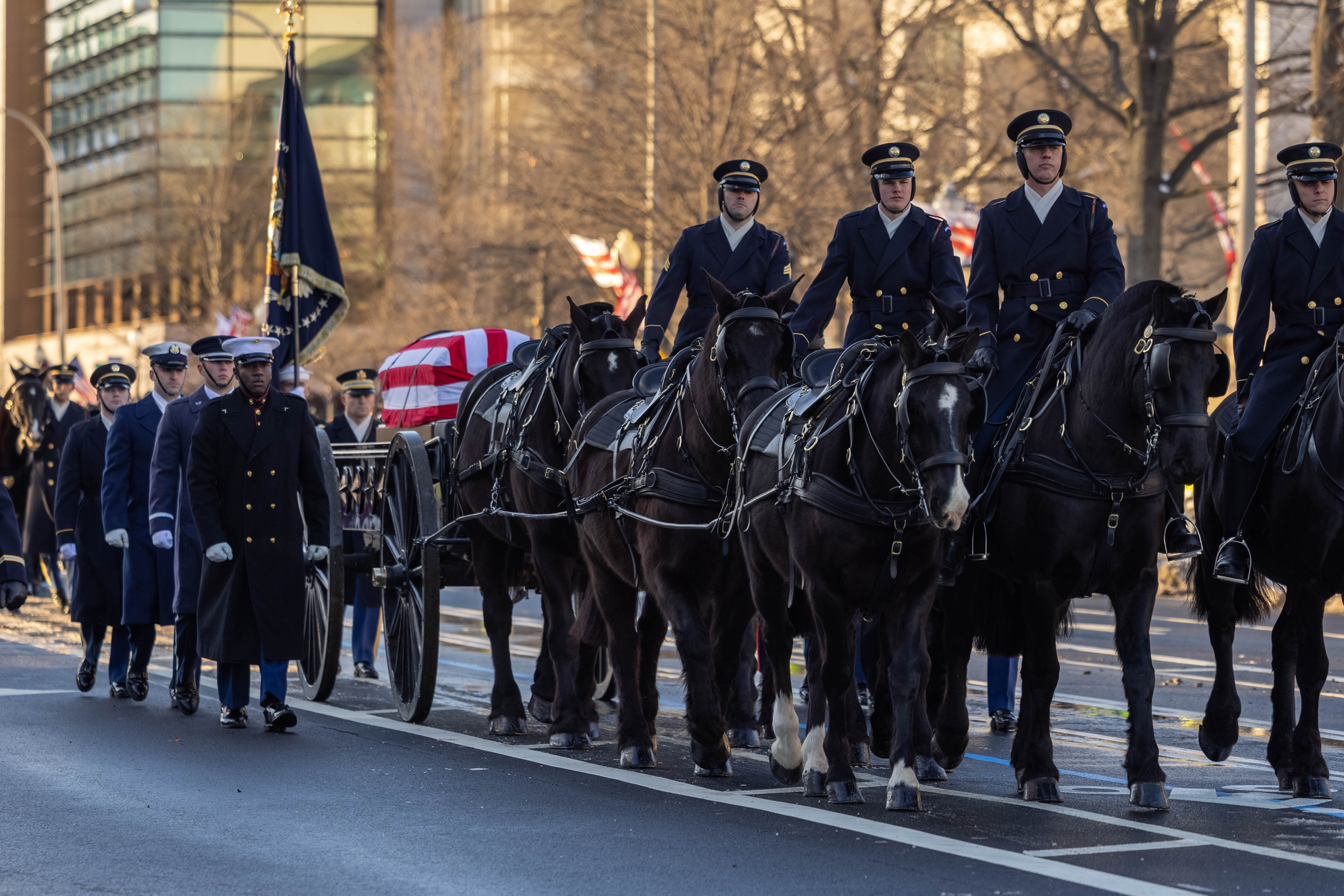
The coffin carrying Carter's body is transported by the caisson platoon of the U.S. Army's presidential escort regiment on Pennsylvania Avenue to the U.S. Capitol

On January 7, Carter's remains were taken from the Carter Center to Dobbins Air Reserve Base in Marietta, and were then flown to Joint Base Andrews in Maryland. Air transport of Carter's remains occurred aboard a VC-25, tail number 29000, of the United States Air Force's 89th Airlift Wing operating under the call sign "Special Air Mission 39". Upon arrival there, Carter's remains were given a 21-gun salute while "Hail to the Chief" played.

The remains were then taken by motorcade to the United States Navy Memorial, where the casket was transferred to a horse-drawn caisson for a funeral procession to the United States Capitol along part of the route Carter took during his 1977 inaugural parade. The transfer site honored Carter's place as the only United States Naval Academy graduate to become commander in chief.

==== Capitol Hill events ====
Upon arrival at the Capitol, another 21-gun salute was given by the Presidential Salute Battery. Members of the honor guard then carried the flag-draped casket up the Capitol steps and into the Capitol rotunda. Inside, the U.S. Army Brass Quintet performed music, such as Simon and Garfunkel's "Bridge over Troubled Water". A service attended by Vice President Kamala Harris, members of Congress, the Supreme Court, Governors, D.C. Mayor Muriel Bowser, the Cabinet, the Diplomatic Corps, and the Joint Chiefs was conducted for Carter.

The opening invocation for the ceremony was delivered by the Chaplain of the U.S. Senate, Barry Black. Vice President Harris, Senate majority leader John Thune, and Speaker of the House Mike Johnson eulogized Carter. Senate minority leader Chuck Schumer joined Thune and House minority leader Hakeem Jeffries joined Johnson in laying wreaths from each chamber of Congress. Vice President Harris was joined by the Second Gentleman, Doug Emhoff, in laying a wreath. The closing benediction was delivered by the Chaplain of the U.S. House of Representatives, Margaret G. Kibben. The Naval Academy Glee Club also performed "My Country, 'Tis of Thee", "Eternal Father, Strong to Save" (the Navy Hymn). He lay in state in the Capitol rotunda on the Lincoln catafalque from January 7 to 9.

==== Washington National Cathedral funeral service ====
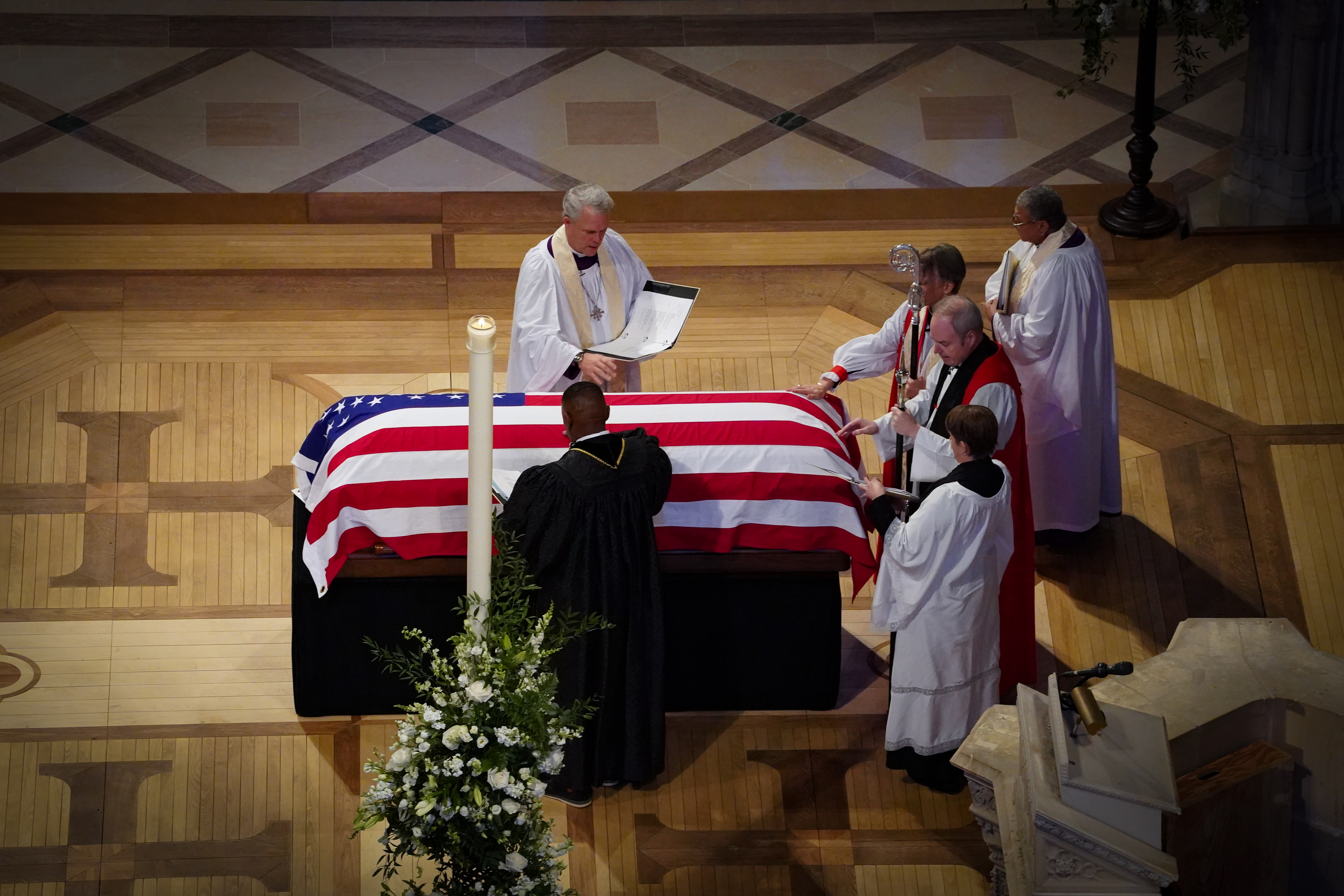
Episcopal and Baptist clergy pray a commendation at Carter's coffin at Washington National Cathedral

Washington National Cathedral hosted the state funeral service on January 9, 2025, which was officiated by the presiding bishop of the Episcopal Church, Sean Rowe, along with the Bishop of Washington, Mariann Budde, and the dean of the cathedral, Randolph Hollerith.

President Biden delivered Carter's eulogy. In addition, Joshua and Jason Carter, Carter's grandsons, delivered readings and the opening homily was delivered by the Reverend Andrew Young, a civil rights leader who was also Carter's former United States ambassador to the United Nations. His grandson, James Carter IV, also quoted Matthew 5:1–16. Eulogies were delivered by Jason and Joshua Carter; Steven Ford on behalf of his father, Gerald Ford, Carter's predecessor as president and opponent in the 1976 presidential election, who died in 2006; Ted Mondale on behalf of his father, Walter Mondale, Carter's vice president, who died in 2021; Stuart E. Eizenstat, issues director of Carter's 1970 gubernatorial campaign, Chief Domestic Policy Adviser during Carter's presidency and former United States ambassador to the European Union; and Reverend Young. Carter's personal pastor, Tony Lowden, was also among those who delivered a pastoral prayer. Music at the service was provided by the Armed Forces Chorus, the National Cathedral Choir, the U.S. Coast Guard Band, and the U.S. Marine Orchestra.

Musical pieces played before the commencement of the funeral service included "God of Our Fathers", "Abide with Me", "America the Beautiful", "My Shepherd Will Supply My Need", "Thou Gracious God, Whose Mercy Lends", "Be Still, My Soul", and "Come, Thou Almighty King". Music during the service included a rendition of "The Road Home" by the National Cathedral Choir, "Amazing Grace" by Phyllis Adams and Lelia Bolden of Song Rise to Thee. Garth Brooks and Trisha Yearwood performed John Lennon's "Imagine", while the U.S. Marine Orchestra and Armed Forces Chorus sang "Eternal Father, Strong to Save". The recessional hymn was "All Hail the Power of Jesus' Name". All five living U.S. presidents were in attendance, as well as all living U.S. first ladies, except Michelle Obama. Also in attendance were Vice President Kamala Harris and Second Gentleman Doug Emhoff, and former vice presidents Dan Quayle, Al Gore, and Mike Pence (as Dick Cheney was absent), as well as all living U.S. second ladies, except Tipper Gore and Lynne Cheney, along with vice president-elect JD Vance and incoming second lady Usha Vance.

=== Stage three: Services in Plains, Georgia ===
U.S. Navy F/A-18 Super Hornets perform a flyover during the private interment of Carter at the Jimmy Carter National Historical Park on January 9, 2025.

After the funeral in Washington, D.C., Carter's remains were driven by motorcade to Joint Base Andrews and were transported on a military flight under the same call sign from Joint Base Andrews to Lawson Army Airfield at Fort Moore in Columbus, Georgia. Upon arrival back in Georgia, Carter's remains traveled by motorcade to Maranatha Baptist Church in his hometown of Plains for a private funeral service with his family and close friends.

Numerous military members greeted the casket, while a 21-plane flyover was conducted before his casket was removed from the hearse. The flyover was held in "missing man" formation, in recognition of his Navy service. The 282 Army Band from Fort Jackson, South Carolina, also played "Hail to the Chief" and the hymns, "It Is Well with My Soul" and "Old Rugged Cross".

As the casket entered the church, the organist played "God of Our Fathers". The church's pastor, Ashley Guthas, opened the service. The service was led by Tony Lowden, who gave the remarks after which the congregation sang the hymn, "Blest Be the Tie that Binds". During the service, the U.S. Navy Sea Chanters provided choral music and sang "America the Beautiful" and "Eternal Father, Strong to Save" as well as a solo rendition "Let There Be Peace on Earth" sang by Joanna Maddox accompanied by Stan Whitmire. Following another performance of "Hail to the Chief", "It Is Well with My Soul" and "Old Rugged Cross" again played as the casket was taken out of the church.

Carter's remains were transported in a final procession through Plains to his home for a private burial. The Fort Moore Maneuver Center of Excellence Band played "The Star-Spangled Banner", "Rock of Ages", and "Eternal Father, Strong to Save". This was followed by the firing of a 21-gun salute, and the playing of "Taps" by a lone bugler. It is customary, and prescribed by military regulation, for all U.S. Army posts equipped with artillery to mark the official conclusion of the state funeral by firing the "Salute to the Union"—50 successive rounds of artillery fire—upon notification that burial has concluded.

Following the funeral, the United States Secret Service announced that it had ceased protecting former President Jimmy Carter on January 10, 2025. Jimmy Carter holds the record for the longest-serving protectee in Secret Service history.

== Dignitaries ==
=== Carter family ===
- John William "Jack" Carter, the former president's son
  - Jason Carter, the former president's grandson
- Donnel Jeffrey "Jeff" Carter, the former president's son
- James Earl "Chip" Carter III, the former president's son
- Amy Carter, the former president's daughter

=== United States ===
- Joe and Jill Biden, president and first lady of the United States
- Donald and Melania Trump, president-elect and 45th president of the United States, and former and incoming first lady of the United States
- Barack Obama, 44th president of the United States
- George W. and Laura Bush, 43rd president of the United States and former first lady of the United States
- Bill and Hillary Clinton, 42nd president of the United States and former first lady of the United States
- Kamala Harris and Doug Emhoff, vice president and second gentleman of the United States
- JD and Usha Vance, United States senator from Ohio and vice president–elect of the United States, and incoming second lady of the United States
- Mike and Karen Pence, former vice president and former second lady of the United States
- Al Gore, former vice president of the United States
- Dan and Marilyn Quayle, former vice president and former second lady of the United States
- John Kerry, former United States secretary of state
- Jeff Zients, Biden's chief of staff
- John Podesta, Biden's climate advisor
- Tom Perez, Director of the Office of Intergovernmental Affairs
- Stuart E. Eizenstat, chief domestic policy adviser during Carter's presidency and former United States ambassador to the European Union
- John Thune, Senate majority leader and senator from South Dakota
- Mike Johnson, Speaker of the United States House of Representatives and representative from Louisiana
- Chuck Schumer, Senate minority leader and senator from New York
- Hakeem Jeffries, House minority leader and representative from New York
- John Roberts, Chief Justice of the United States
- Samuel Alito, Supreme Court justice
- Sonia Sotomayor, Supreme Court justice
- Elena Kagan, Supreme Court justice
- Amy Coney Barrett, Supreme Court justice
- Brett Kavanaugh, Supreme Court justice
- Ketanji Brown Jackson, Supreme Court justice
- Raphael Warnock, senator from Georgia
- Jon Ossoff, senator from Georgia
- Andrew Young, Carter's ambassador to the United Nations

=== Foreign ===
- Justin Trudeau, Prime Minister of Canada
- Juan Manuel Santos, former president of Colombia
- Yoshihide Suga, former prime minister of Japan
- Princess Mabel of Orange-Nassau (representing King Willem-Alexander of the Netherlands)
- Martín Torrijos, former president of Panama
- Marcelo Rebelo de Sousa, President of Portugal
- Prince Edward, Duke of Edinburgh (representing King Charles III of the United Kingdom and other Commonwealth realms)
- Gordon Brown, former prime minister of the United Kingdom
- António Guterres, Secretary-General of the United Nations

== Gallery ==
Carter state funeral

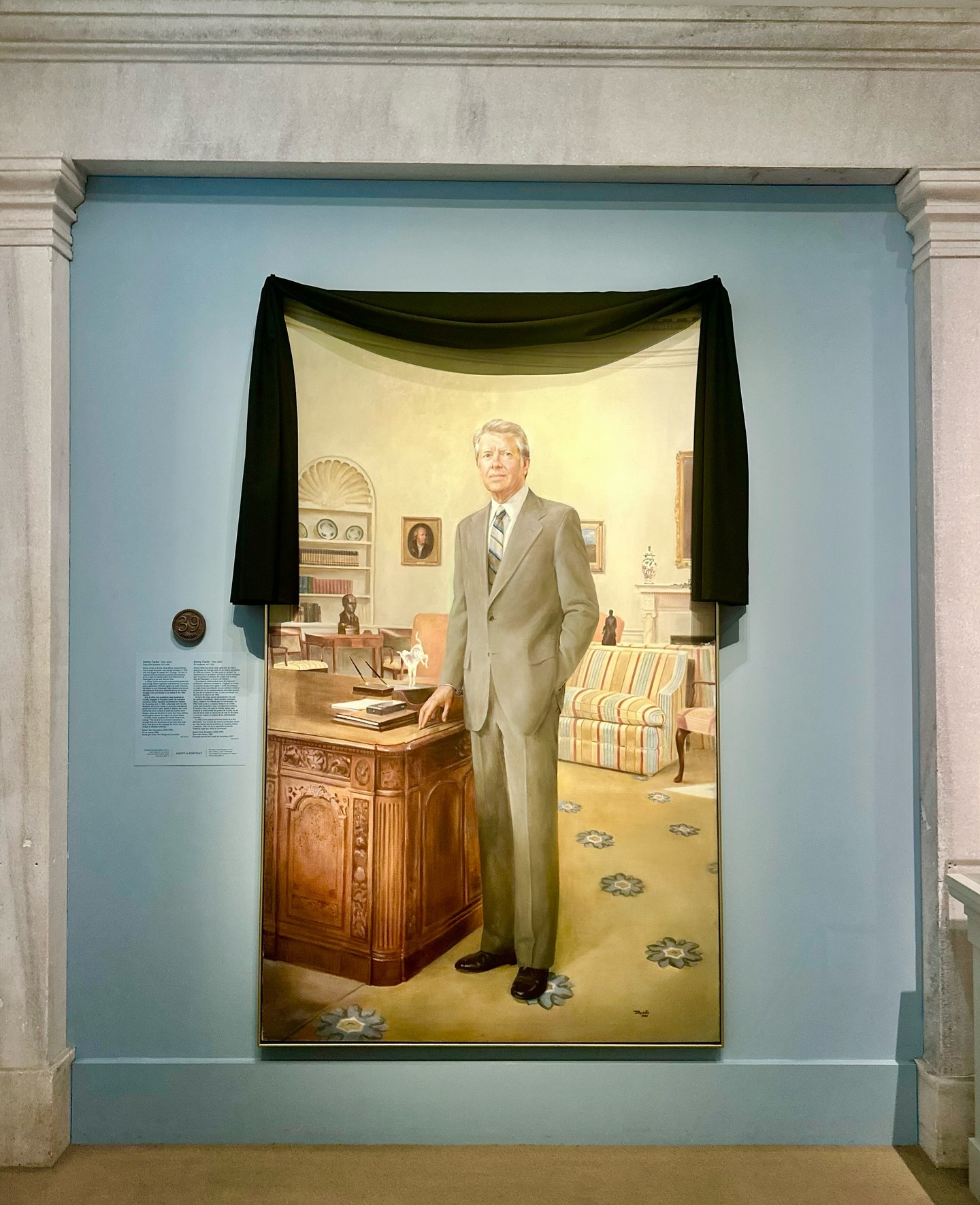
Portrait of Jimmy Carter at the National Portrait Gallery dressed in black mourning drape (December 31, 2024)

A motor hearse carrying Carter's remains passes the Jimmy Carter National Historical Park en route to Atlanta, Georgia for the start of the state funeral. (January 4, 2025)

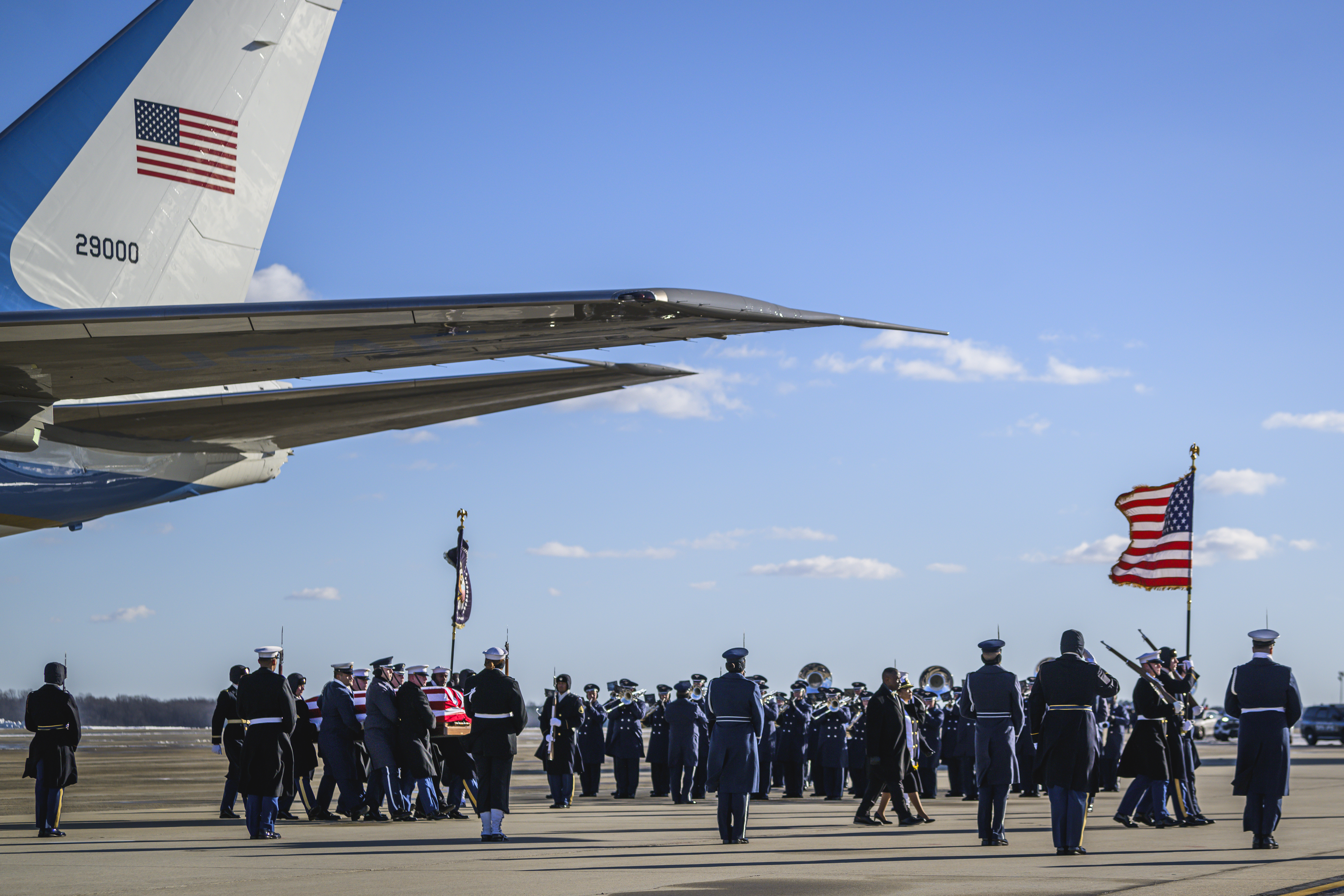
Carter's casket is disembarked from a U.S. Air Force aircraft in Washington, D.C. (January 7, 2025)

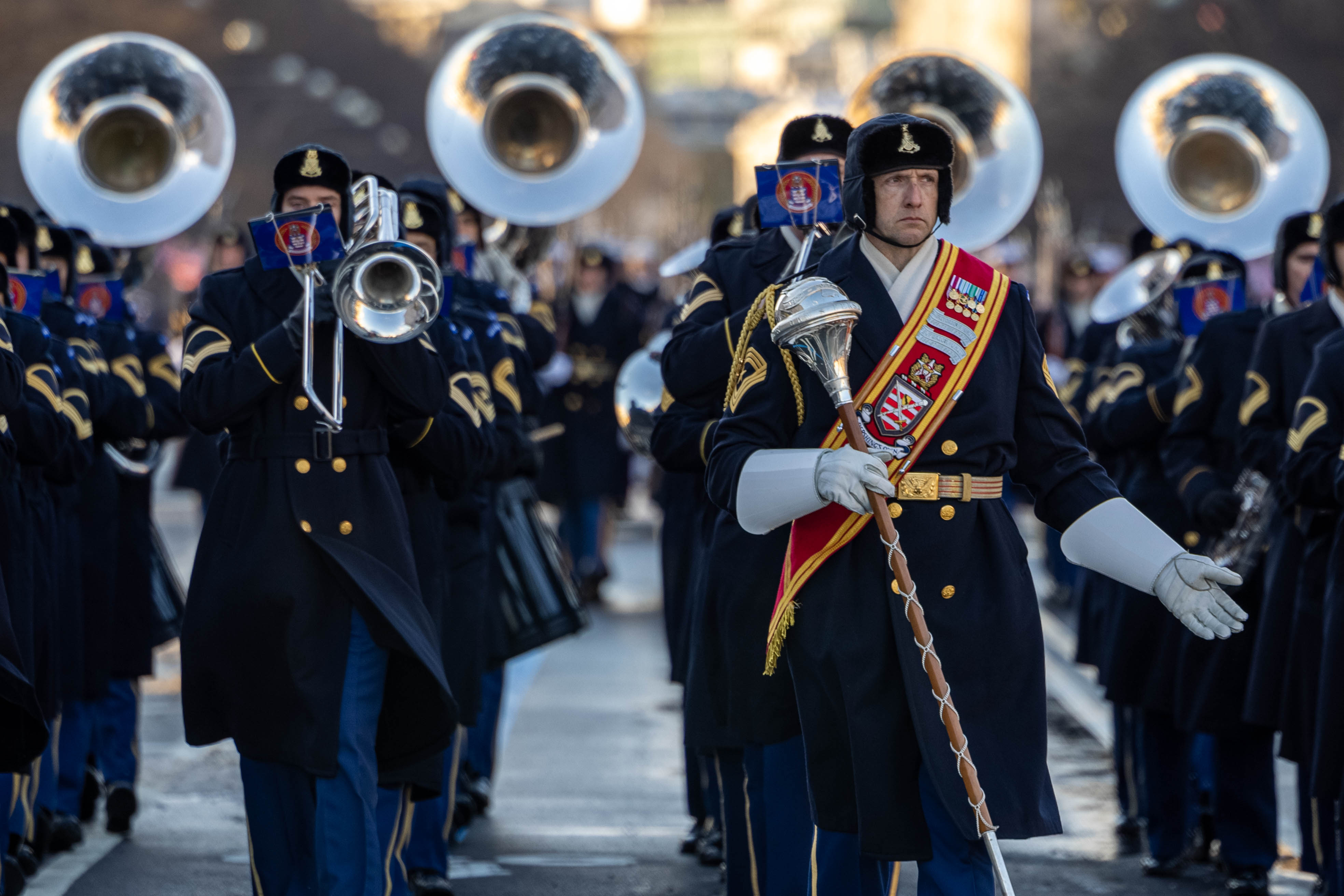
The United States Army Band "Pershing's Own" pictured during the funeral procession (January 7, 2025)

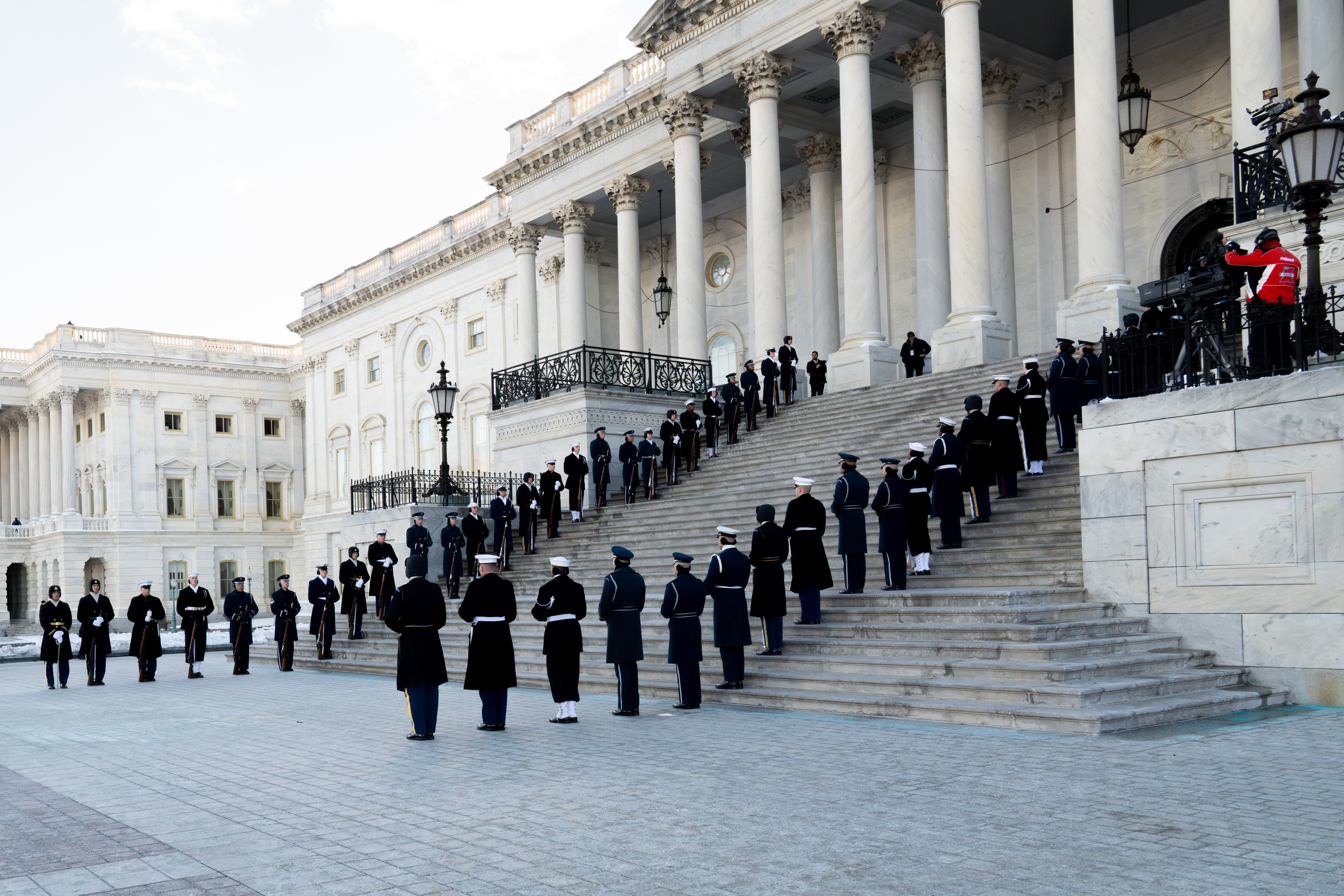
An honor guard drawn from the forces of the Joint Task Force – National Capital Region lines the steps of the U.S. Capitol prior to the arrival of Carter's casket for the lying in state (January 7, 2025)

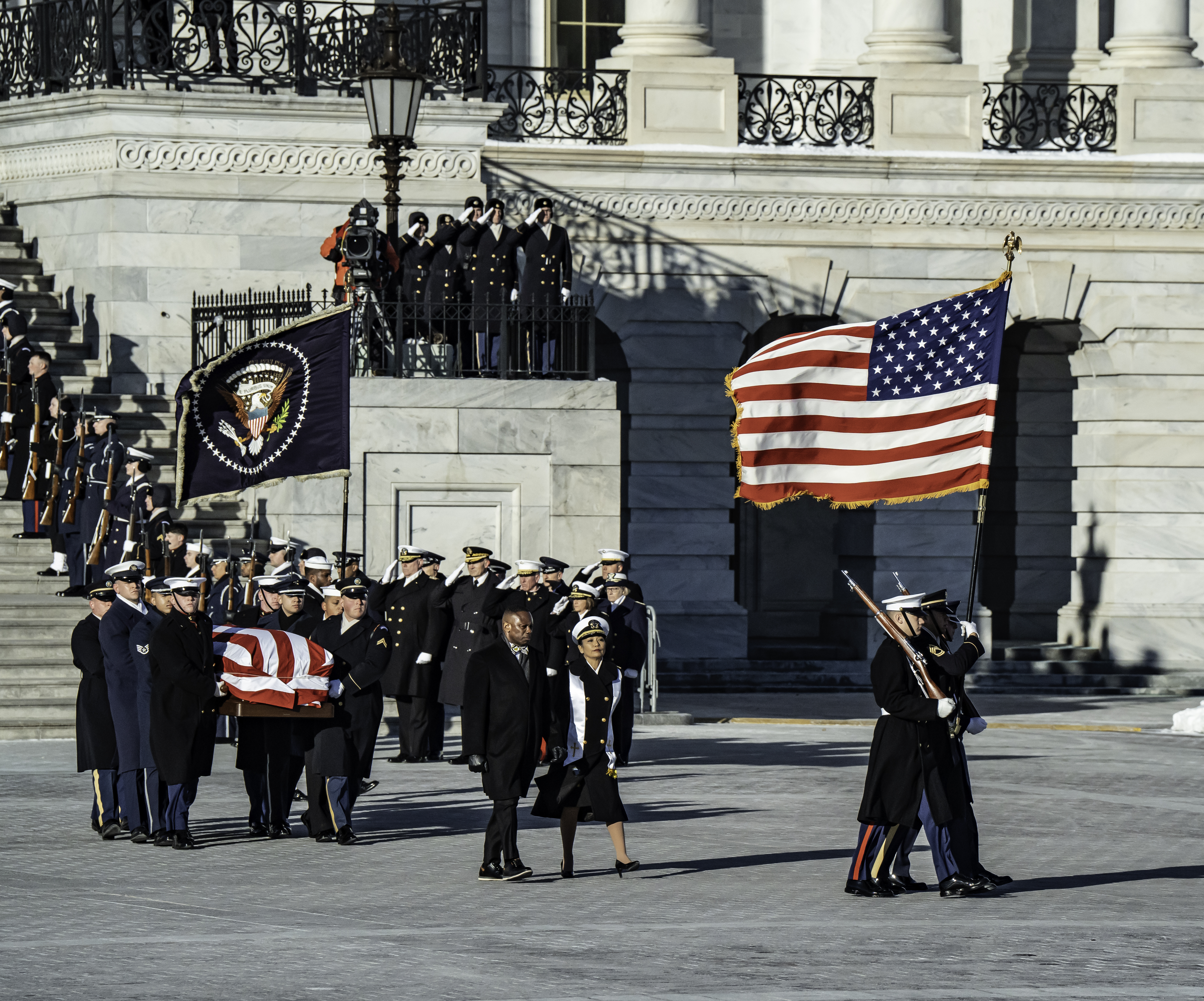
The casket containing Carter's body is removed from the U.S. Capitol for transfer to the National Cathedral (January 9, 2025)

== See also ==
- State funerals in the United States
