= Jimmy Carter House =

Home in Plains, Georgia

- Jimmy Carter House, Memorial Garden and Gravesite
- U.S. Historic district – Contributing property
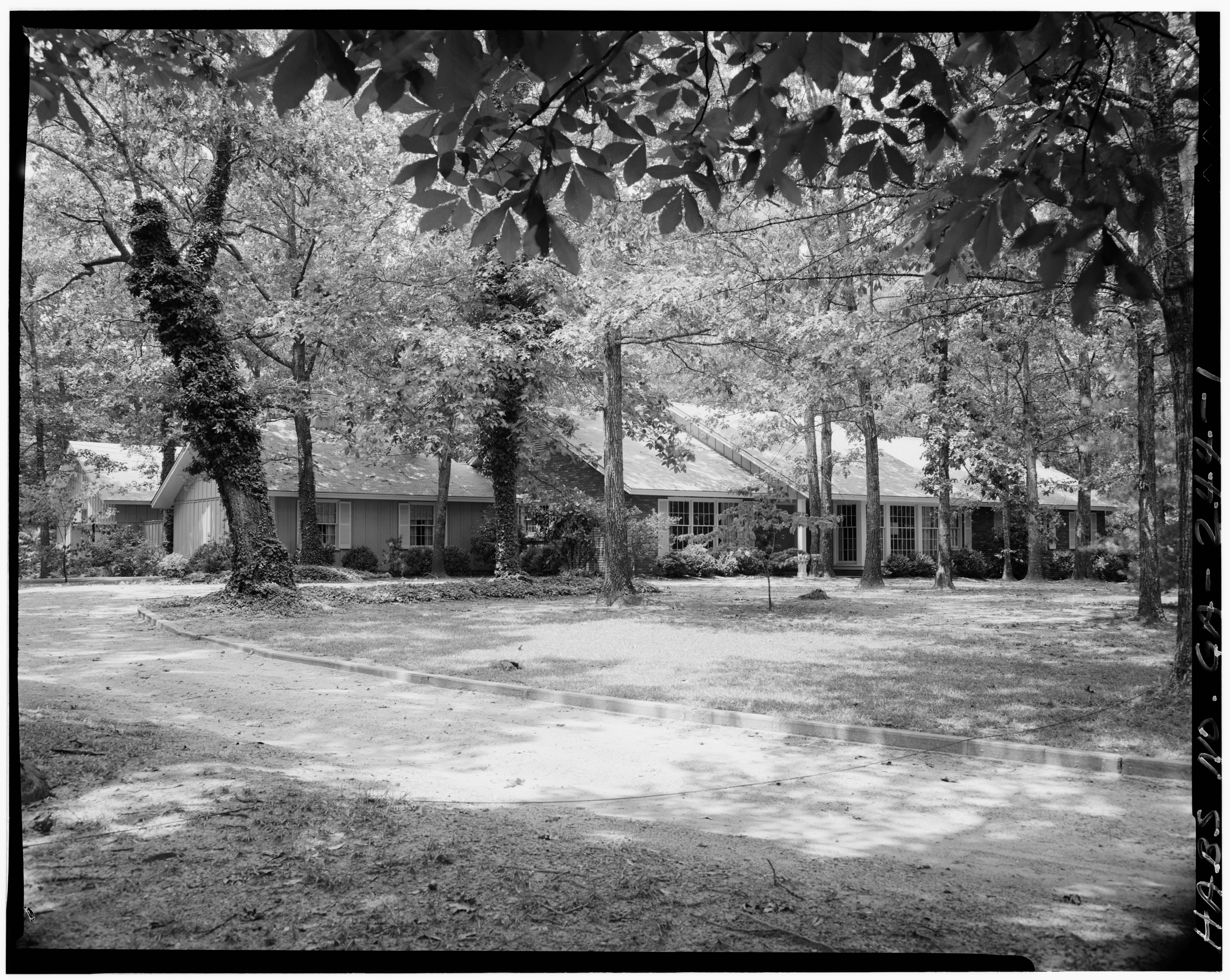
- Front facade of 209 Woodland Drive, 1979

- Location within Georgia Location within the United States
- Location: 209 Woodland Drive (house); 1 Woodland Drive (gravesite & memorial garden); Plains, Georgia
- Coordinates: 32°02′08″N 84°24′06″W
- Built: 1960; 66 years ago
- Part of: Jimmy Carter National Historical Park (ID01000272)

The Jimmy Carter House, Memorial Garden and Gravesite is the longtime home and final resting place of Jimmy Carter (1924–2024), the 39th president of the United States, and his wife Rosalynn Carter (1927–2023), located at 209 Woodland Drive in Plains, Georgia, United States, within the Jimmy Carter National Historical Park. It is the only house that the Carters ever owned, and the family occupied it from 1961 until Jimmy Carter's death in 2024.

The house was built by the Carters in 1960 and 1961, and additional work on the home occurred in 1974 and 1981, with the addition of a porch, garage, and guest apartment. The Carters knocked down a wall themselves during remodeling of the house in the 2010s. Rosalynn Carter described the work of knocking down the wall as "second-nature" due to the couple's extensive work with the charity Habitat for Humanity.

The one-story house is set on a lot of 2.4 acres (0.97 ha); it was built at a price of $10 per square foot (equivalent to $109 in 2025). The house was built to accommodate the Carters' growing family; they had three young sons, James, Donnel, and Jack, at the time of its construction, and when new had four bedrooms. The property was, until the death of Jimmy Carter, protected by the U.S. Secret Service with public access to Woodland Drive and the property prohibited. The United States government purchased the adjacent property at 1 Woodland Drive (referred as "Gnann House") in 1981 following the Carters' return from Washington D.C. for use by the Carters' Secret Service protection detail until January 2025.

A pond on the grounds, now part of the memorial garden, was personally dug by Jimmy Carter; he used it for fly fishing. A magnolia tree on the grounds was grown from a tree on the lawn of the White House that was planted by President Andrew Jackson.

The Historic American Buildings Survey describes the house as a "modest 1960s ranch-style house". In a 2018 profile of the Carters' life in Plains for The Washington Post, Kevin Sullivan and Mary Jordan described the house as "dated, but homey and comfortable".

== Gravesite and Memorial Garden ==
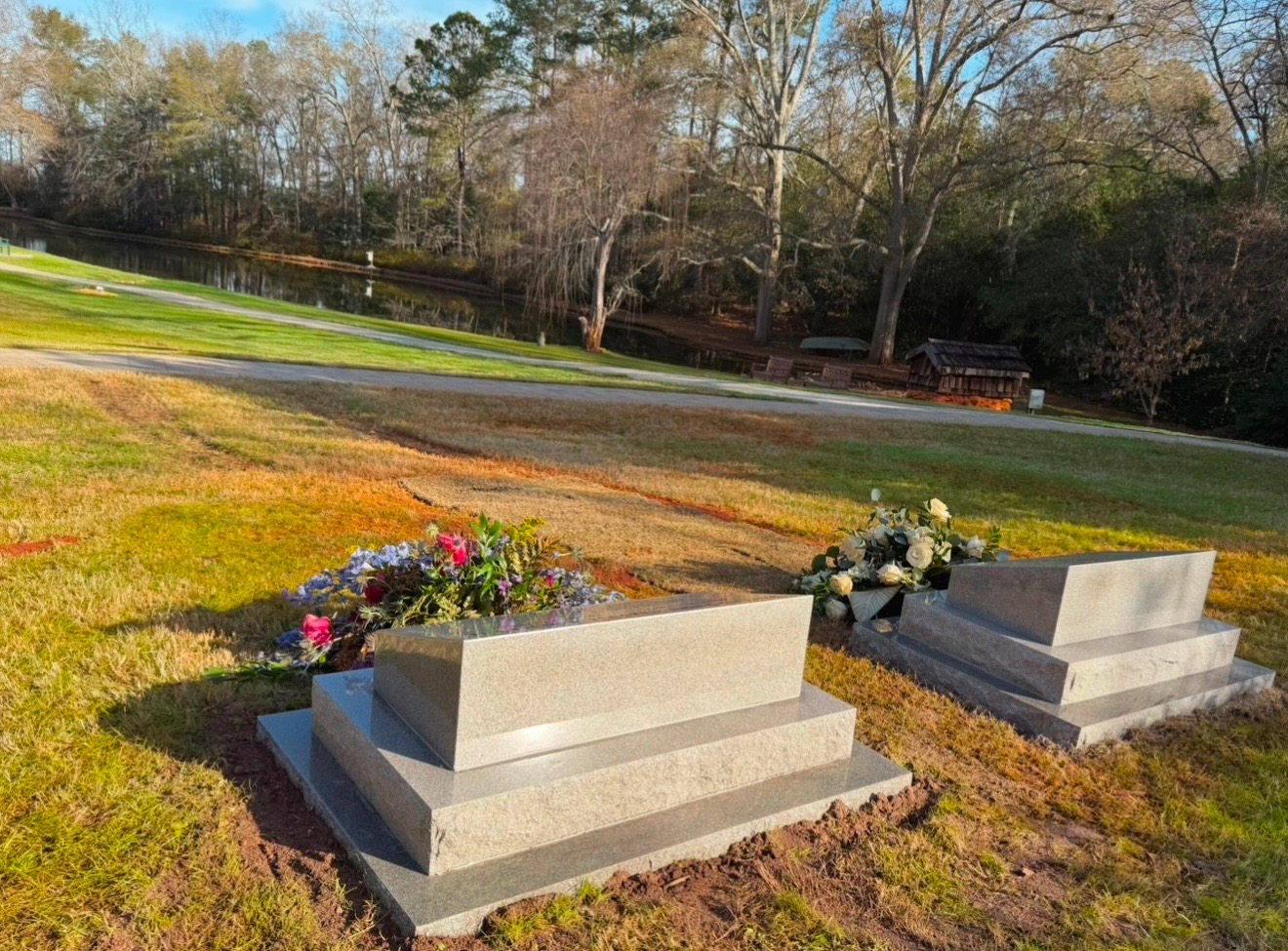
Jimmy and Rosalynn Carter's grave near their home in Plains, Georgia

Jimmy and Rosalynn Carter are buried across Woodland Drive from the house next to a willow tree on the lawn of the property near the pond. After Jimmy Carter's death and in accordance with the Carters' wishes, the National Park Service renovated the gravesite and gardens around the pond for public access and use. Both areas, along with Woodland Drive, were open to the public in July 2025 as part of the Jimmy Carter National Historical Park. The garden is managed along environmental principles that reflect Rosalynn Carter's interest in pollinator gardens.

== Future plans ==
Prior to Jimmy and Rosalynn Carter's deaths, the deed to the house and property was granted to the National Park Service (NPS) for the purpose of turning the property into a museum after the Carters' deaths. While the gravesite and memorial garden is open to the public, all other parts of the property, including the Carter home, remain off-limits while renovations occur.

The Carters were actively involved in planning the future museum; their involvement as living participants in a presidential home museum project is unique. Future tours are expected to include the pool, tennis courts and back patio of the house. As part of the ongoing renovations, new paths and benches will be constructed. Jimmy Carter's wood shop will also be on display. The NPS plans to make the proposed museum of the house reflect the couple's use of the residence "as a place for both refuge and recreation".

Some of the 8,500 acres that make up the Carter family farm was sold to the Conservation Fund for $8.5 million in November 2026; the organization said they planned to eventually transfer the land to the state of Georgia to be part of a public park. The organization also said that the land was going to "end up permanently protected in the way [Carter] would have wanted to see."

== See also ==
- List of residences of presidents of the United States
- List of burial places of presidents and vice presidents of the United States
