= Jimmy Carter National Historical Park =

National Historical Park of the US in Georgia

- U.S. National Register of Historic Places
- Former U.S. National Historic Site
- U.S. National Historical Park
- Georgia Register of Historic Places
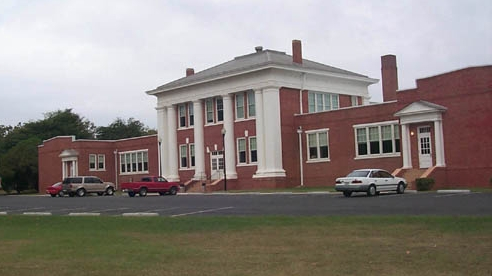
- Jimmy Carter National Historical Park Visitor Center

- Location within Georgia Location within the United States
- Interactive map showing the location of Jimmy Carter National Historical Park
- Location: 300 N. Bond St., Plains, Georgia
- Coordinates: 32.0304393°N 84.4182473°W
- Area: 71 acres (29 ha)
- Visitation: 39,101 (2025)
- Website: Jimmy Carter National Historical Park
- NRHP reference No.: 01000272

Significant dates
- Designated NHS: December 23, 1987
- Designated NHP: 2021

The Jimmy Carter National Historical Park, located in Plains, Georgia, preserves sites associated with Jimmy Carter (1924–2024), 39th president of the United States. These include his residence, boyhood farm, school, and the town railroad depot, which served as his campaign headquarters during the 1976 election. The building which used to be Plains High School (opened in 1921 and closed in 1979) serves as the park's museum and visitor center. When Carter lived in Plains, the area surrounding the residence was under the protection of the United States Secret Service. The residence is also the burial site of Carter and his wife, First Lady Rosalynn Carter (1927–2023). While the residence itself is undergoing renovation and is not open to the public, the adjoining Carter gravesite and memorial garden is publicly accessible.

The Carters returned to Plains in 1981 after Carter’s landslide defeat in the 1980 Presidential Election to Republican Party nominee Ronald Reagan. The former President and First Lady pursued many of the goals of his administration through the Carter Center in Atlanta, which has programs to alleviate human suffering and to promote human rights and world peace. Carter taught Sunday school at Maranatha Baptist Church, which is open to the public.

It was established in 1987 by Pub. L. 100–206 as Jimmy Carter National Historic Site and renamed as a National Historical Park in 2021.

== Visitor center and museum ==
The former Plains High School, which both Jimmy and Rosalynn Carter attended and operated from 1921 until 1979 when it permanently closed down due to declining student enrolment and consolidation of local school districts, now serves as the park's visitor center and museum. It features a classroom, principal's office, and auditorium which have been meticulously restored in 1996 to look as they would have when Jimmy Carter attended. An exact replica of the Resolute desk, which Jimmy Carter brought back to the Oval Office to use as his presidential desk, is exhibited, as well as his Nobel Peace Prize which he won in 2002 for his post-presidential global humanitarian efforts. Other rooms feature exhibits that explain the lives of Jimmy and Rosalynn Carter, and a short video focuses on the life of Jimmy Carter according to his friends, neighbors, and family.

== Boyhood home and farm ==
The farm in the nearby unincorporated community of Archery where Jimmy lived from age four in 1928 until he left for college in 1941 has been restored to its appearance before electricity was installed in 1938.

== Campaign headquarters ==
The former Plains Train Depot, where Carter headquartered his presidential campaign, now serves as a museum focusing on the 1976 Presidential Campaign and Election. It features exhibits which highlight Jimmy Carter's campaign for President. The train depot operated from 1888 until 1951, when all public transportation to and from the area was ceased due to years of declining demand and profitability that was exaggerated during the Great Depression which greatly decimated the rural city’s local economy.

== Carter home, burial site and memorial garden ==
The long-time home of the Carters at 209 Woodland Drive, while not yet open to the public, is a part of the park. The Carters lived in the home from 1961. During his presidency, it was used as his Summer White House. The intent is for the National Park Service (NPS) to turn the house into a museum and open it to the public in the future.

Jimmy and Rosalynn Carter are buried across Woodland Drive from the house. The gravesite and a memorial garden are located near a pond and by a willow tree. After renovations which were begun after Jimmy Carter's death to make the area publicly accessible, the Carters gravesite, memorial garden and Woodland Drive were open to the public in July 2025.

== Photos ==
=== Plains train depot ===
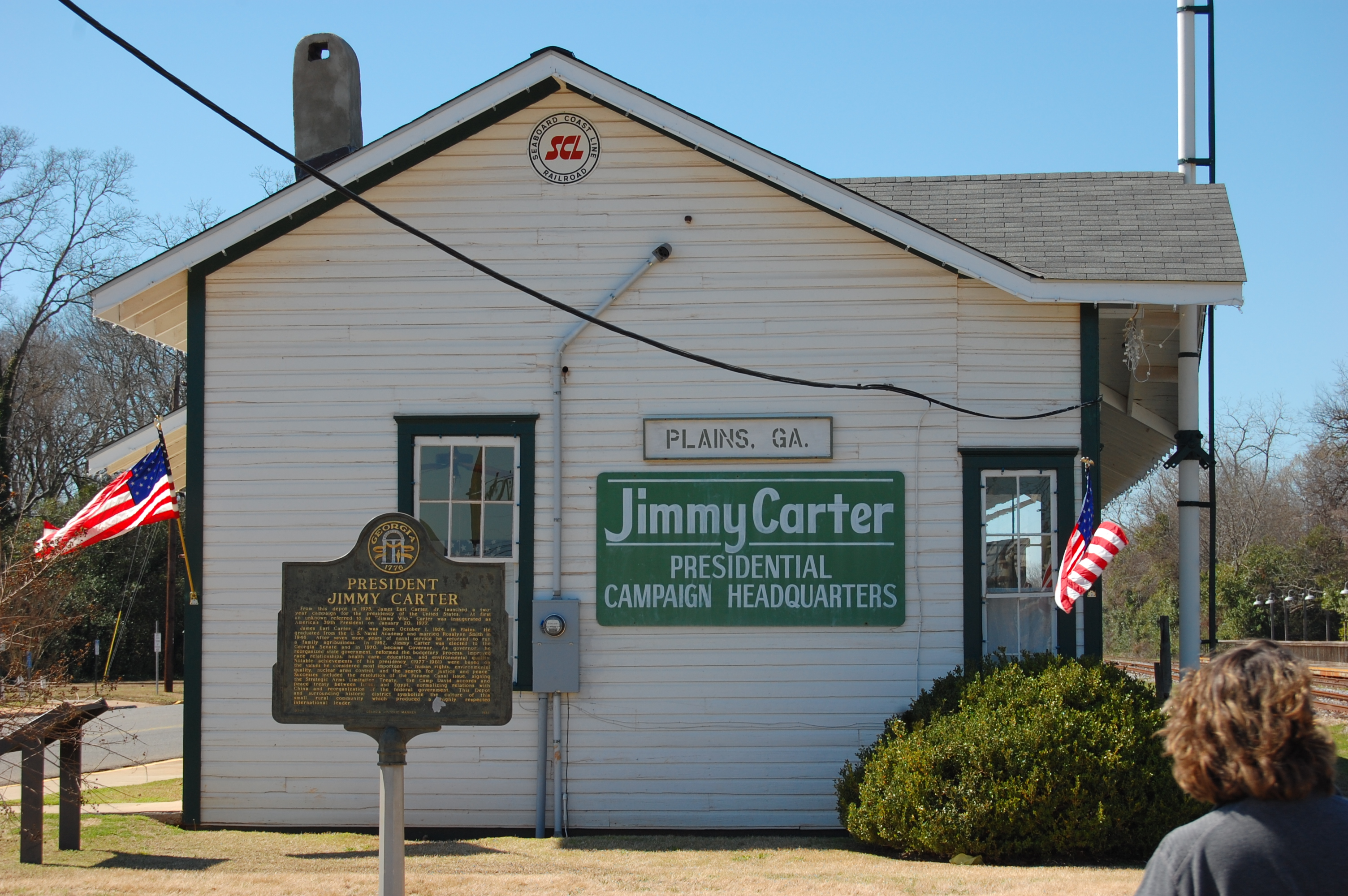
Plains former train depot, which operated from 1888 until 1951 and later served as the 1976 Carter campaign headquarters

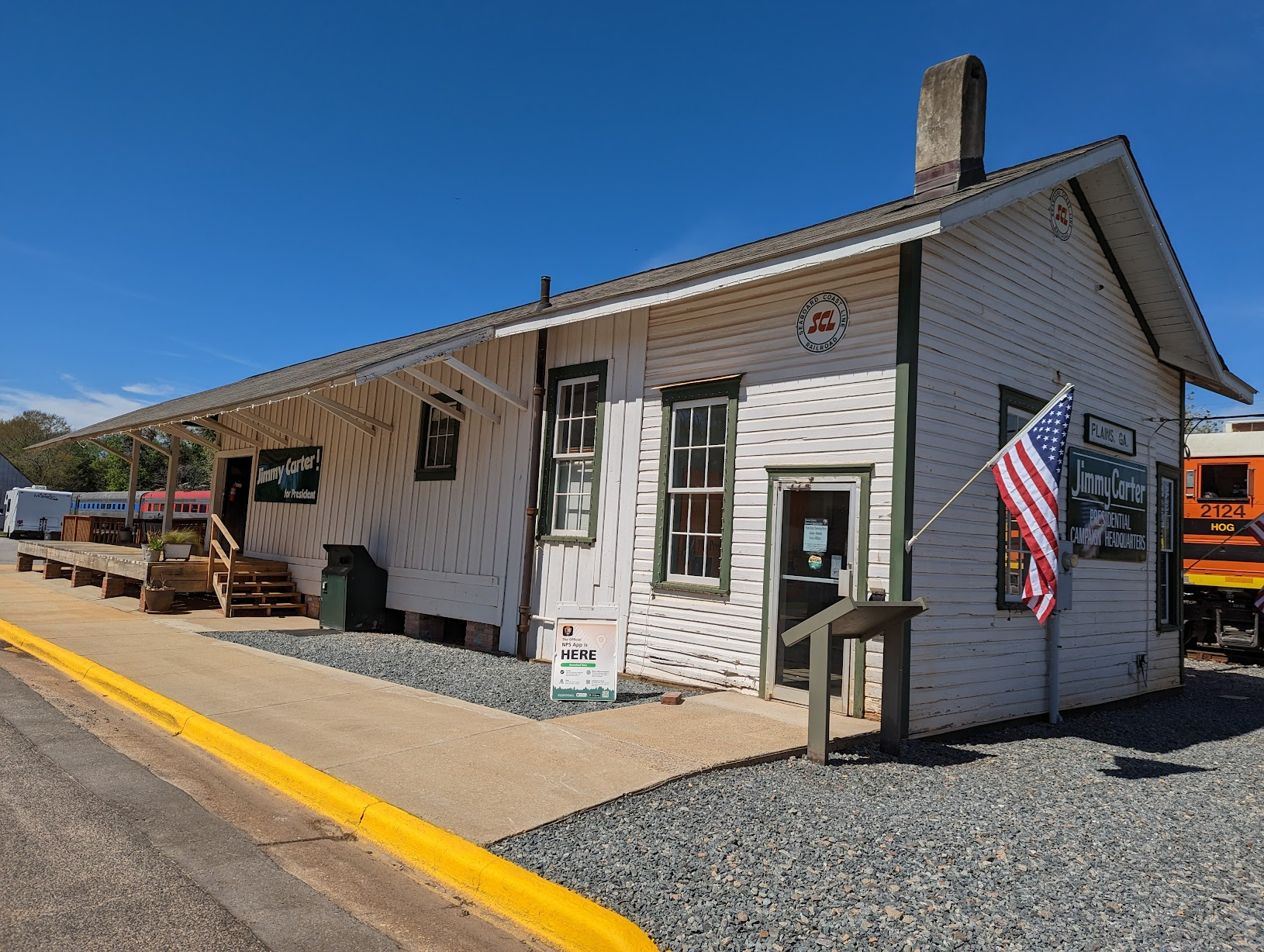
The train depot, viewed from the north

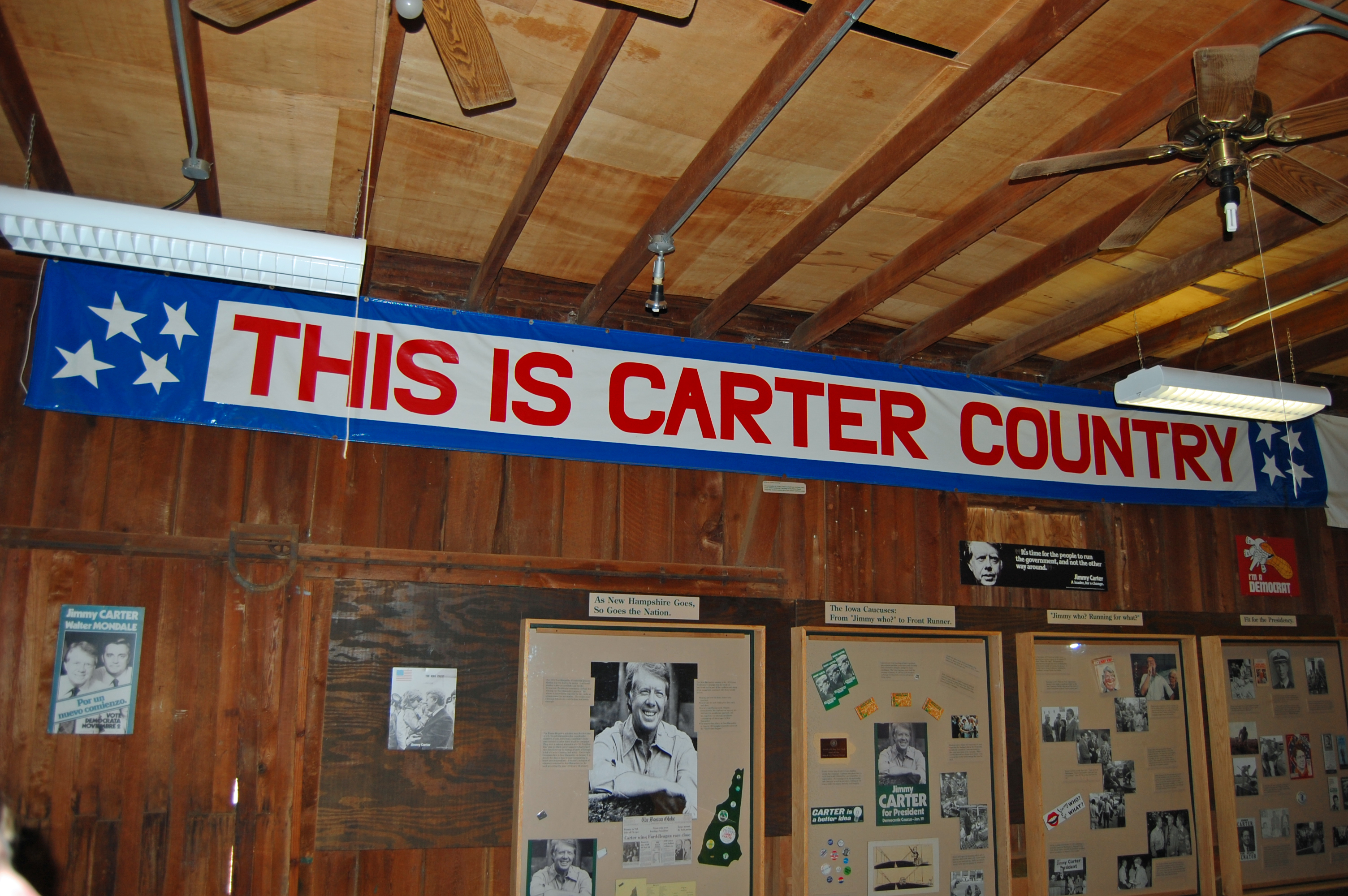
Interior of the campaign headquarters

=== Visitor center and museum ===
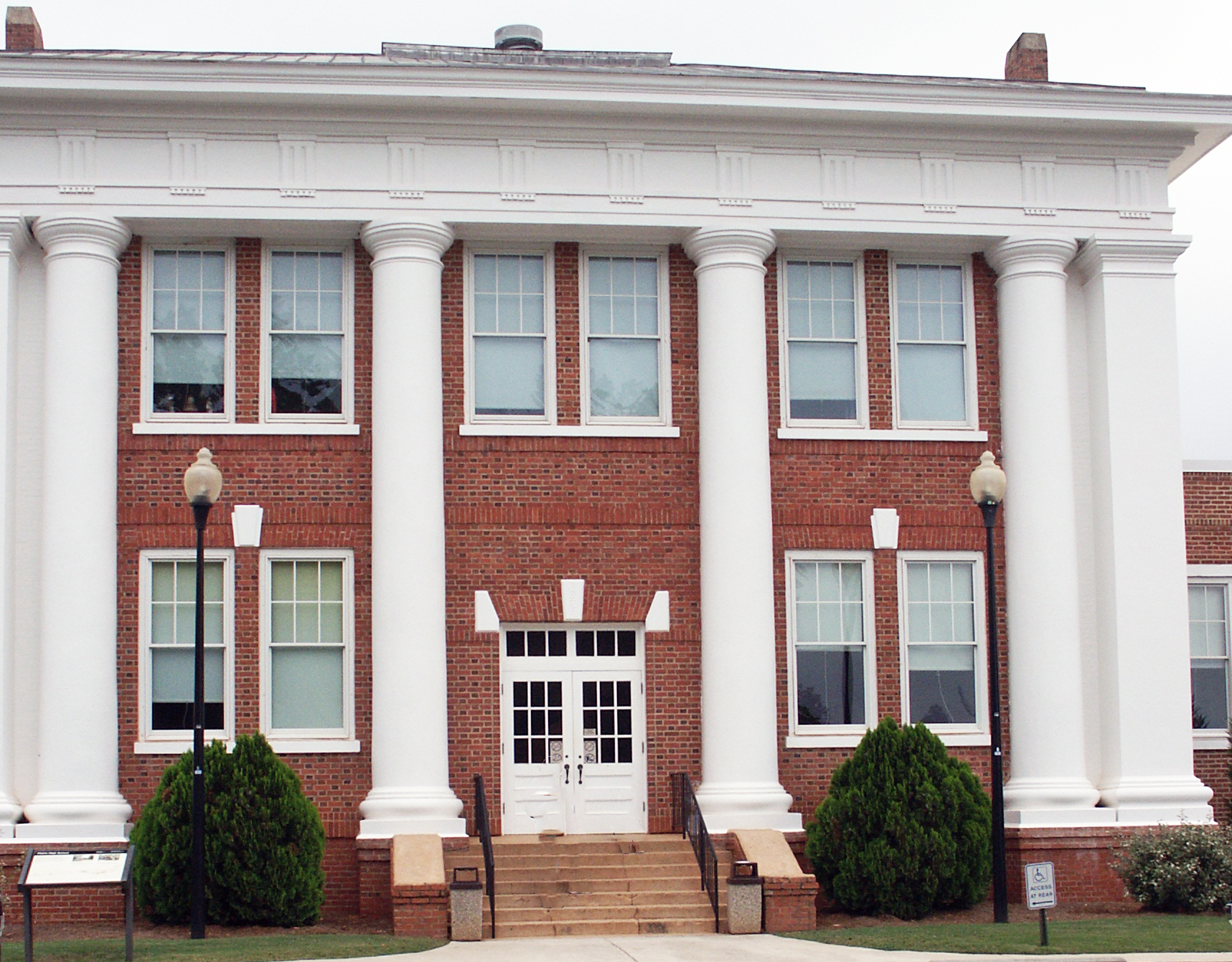
Carter's high school, now a museum and visitor center

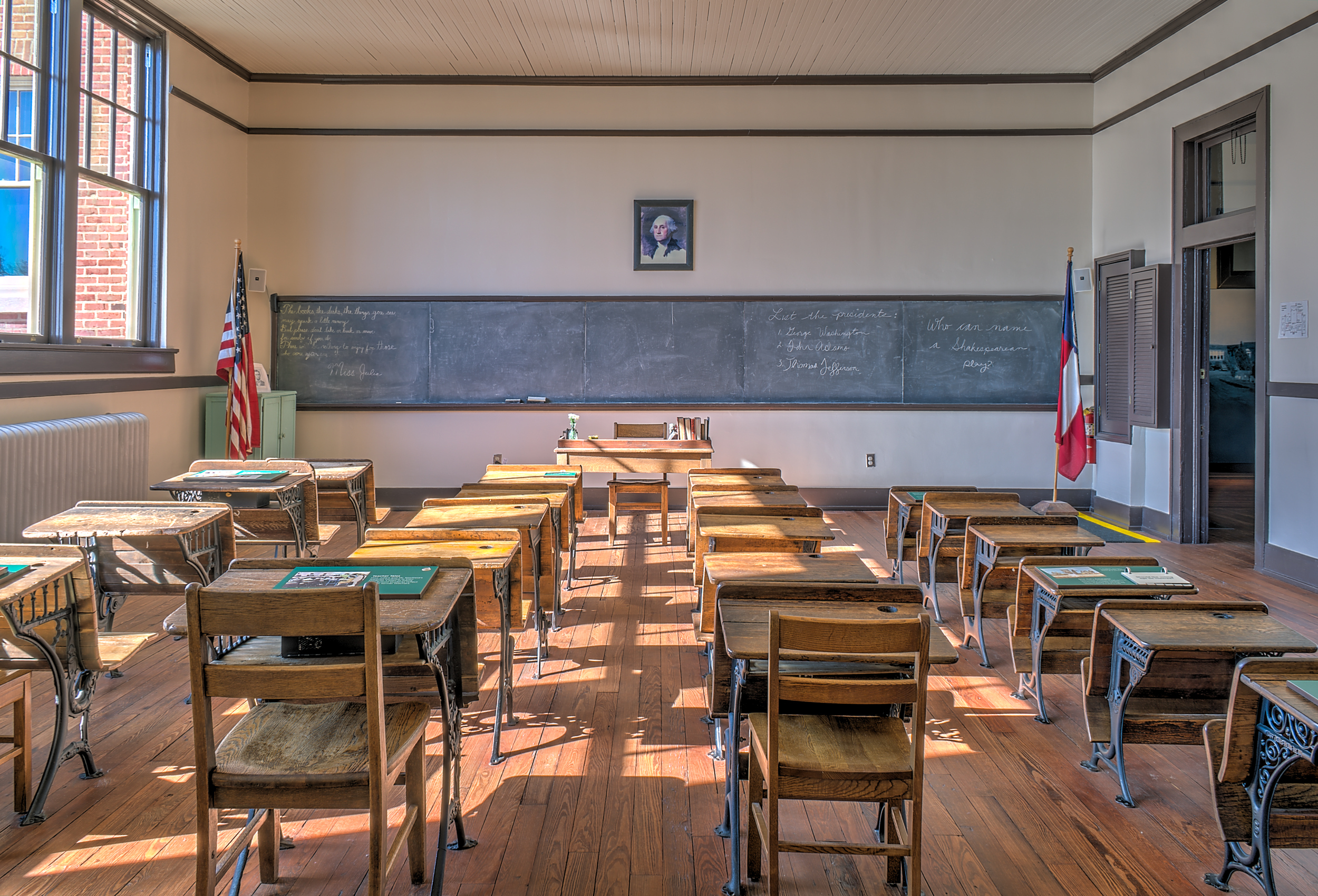
Detail of classroom

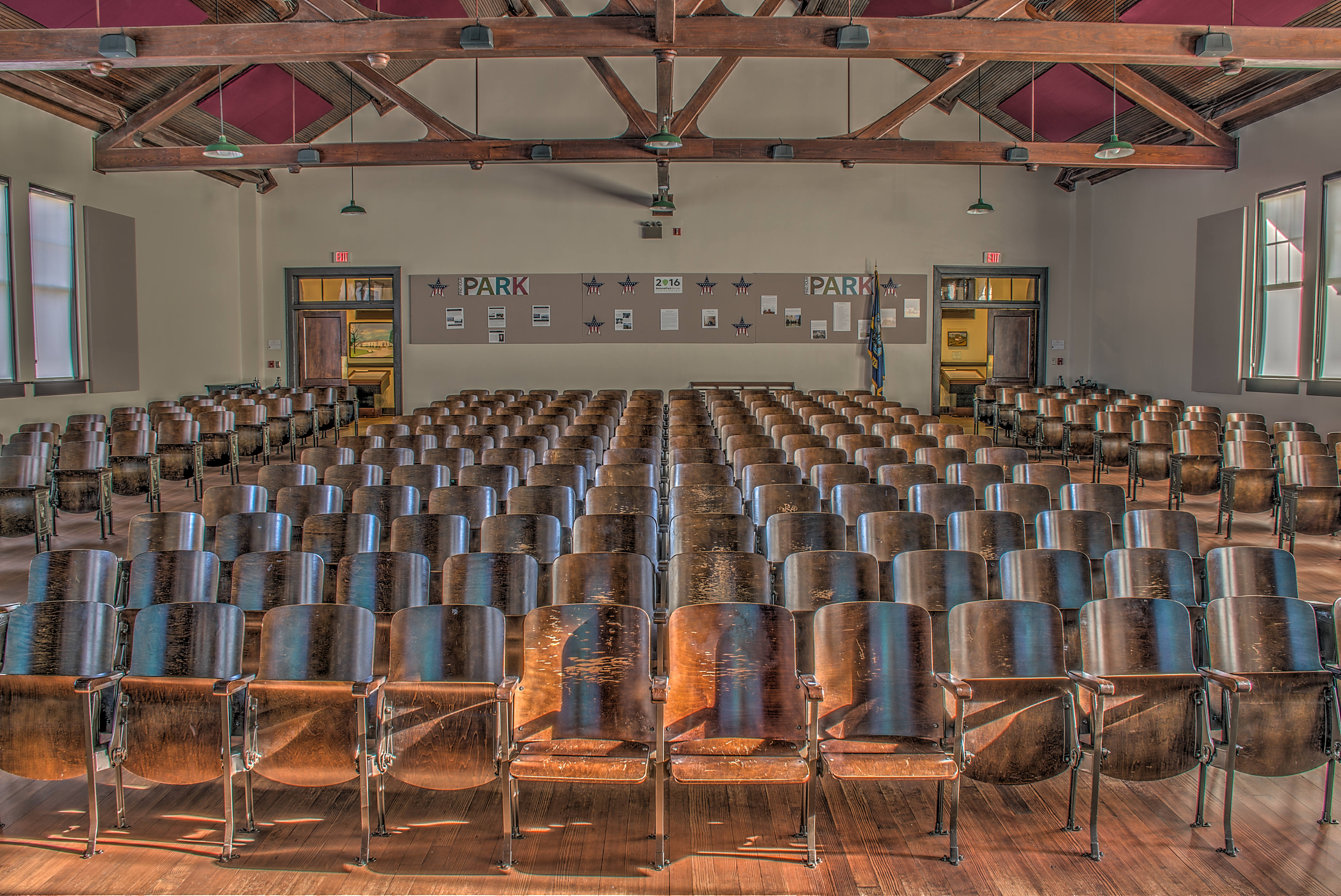
Auditorium

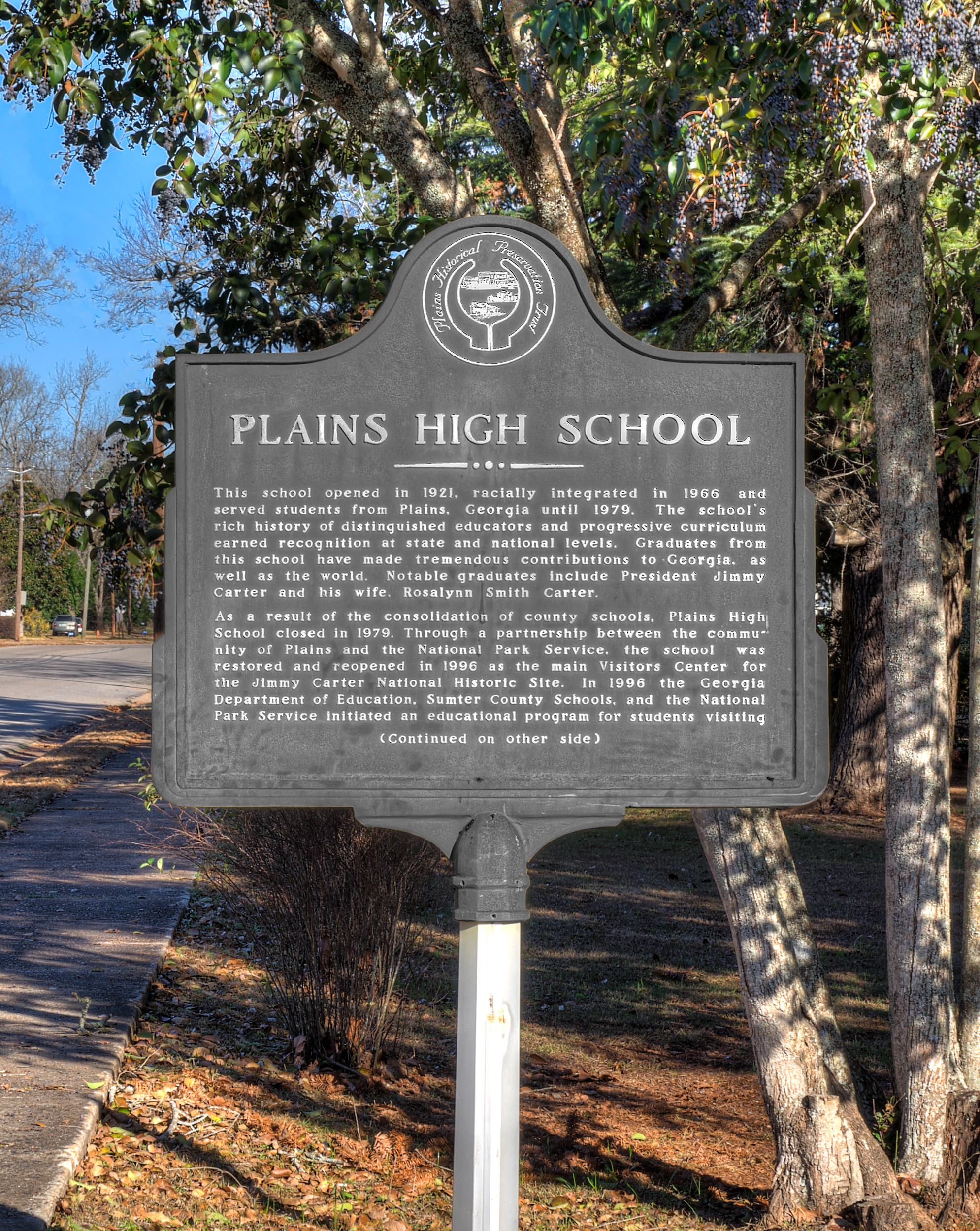
Historical marker

=== Carter boyhood farm ===
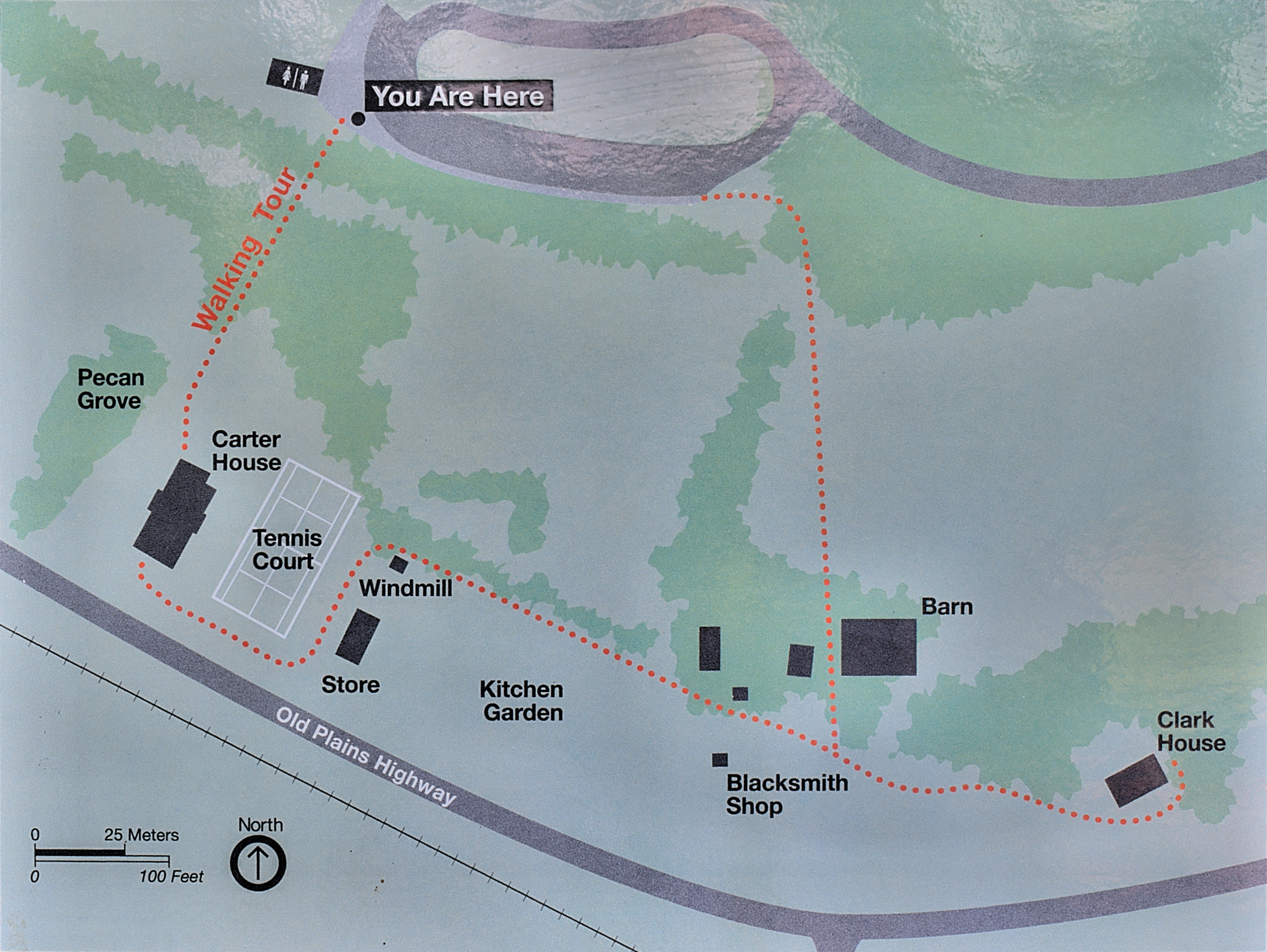
Map of farm

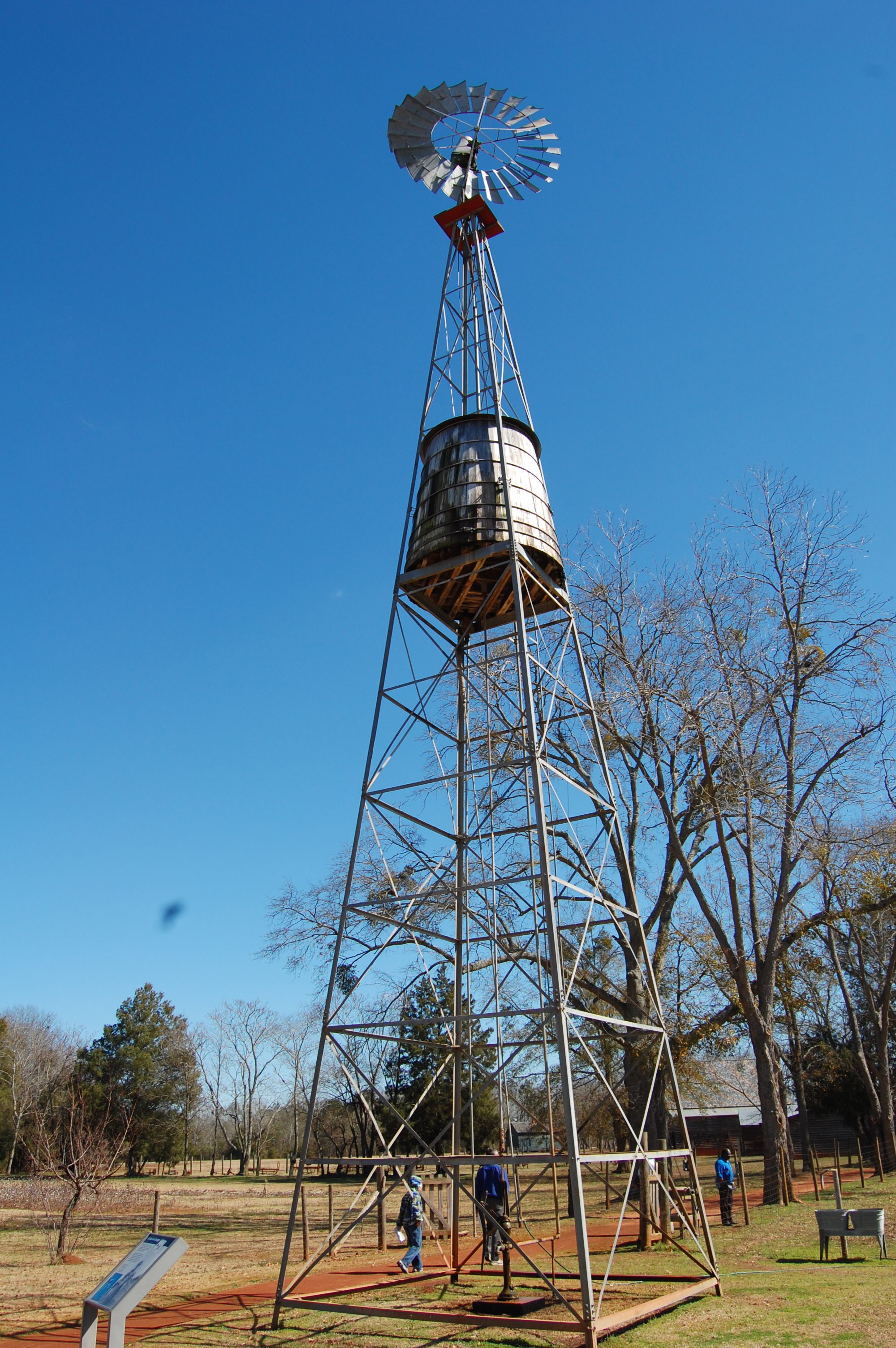
A water pump powered by a windmill

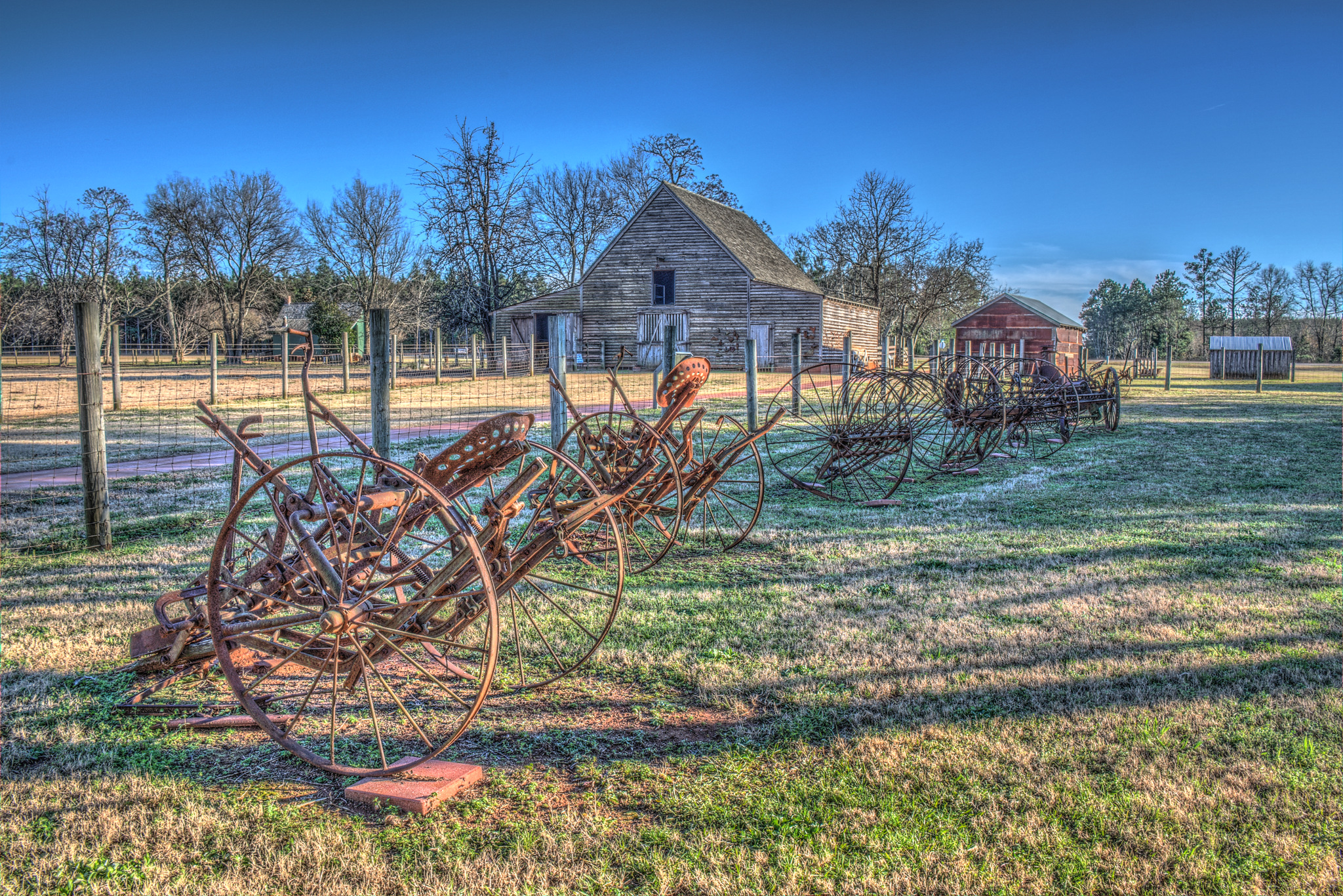
Barn and old farm equipment

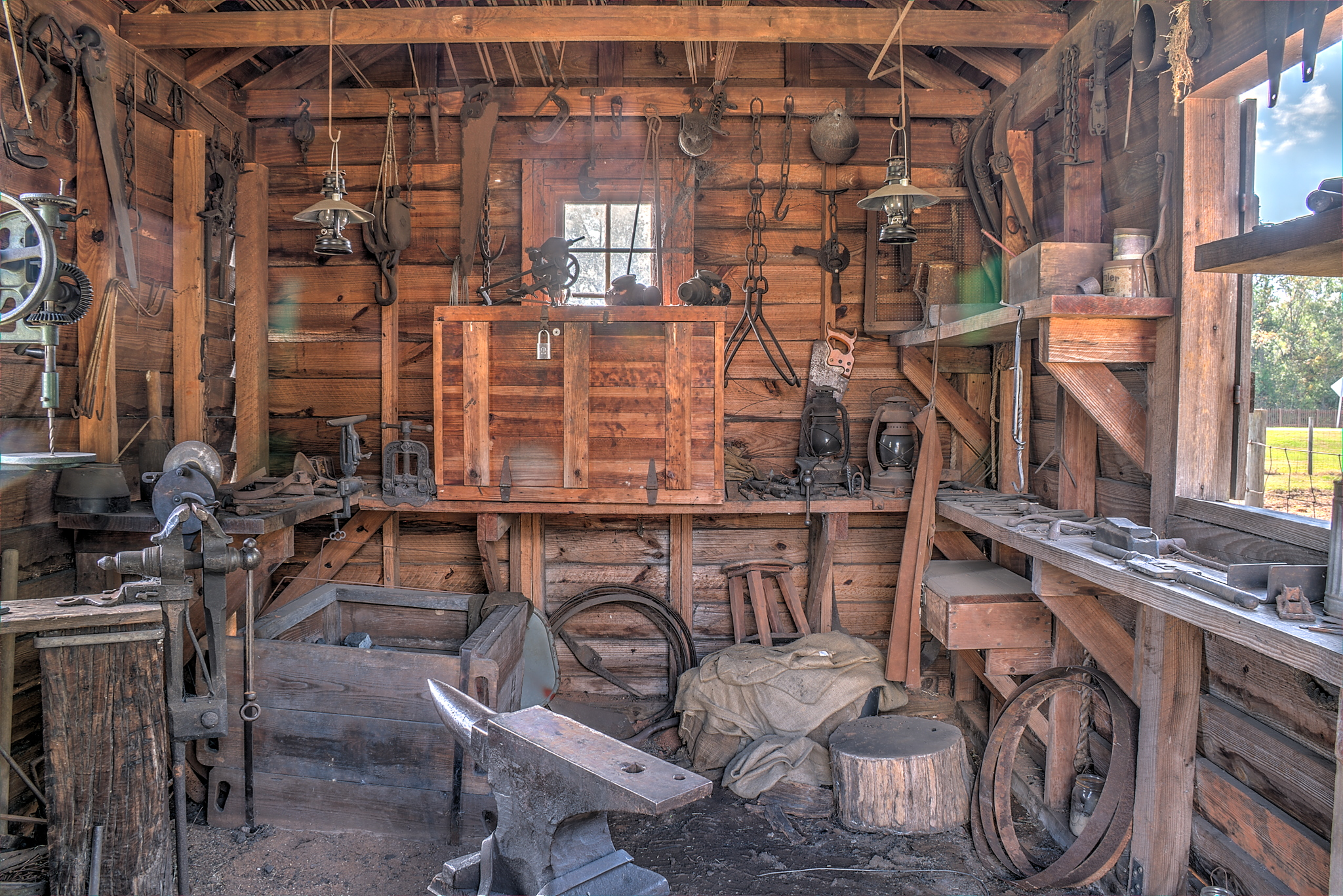
Blacksmith shop
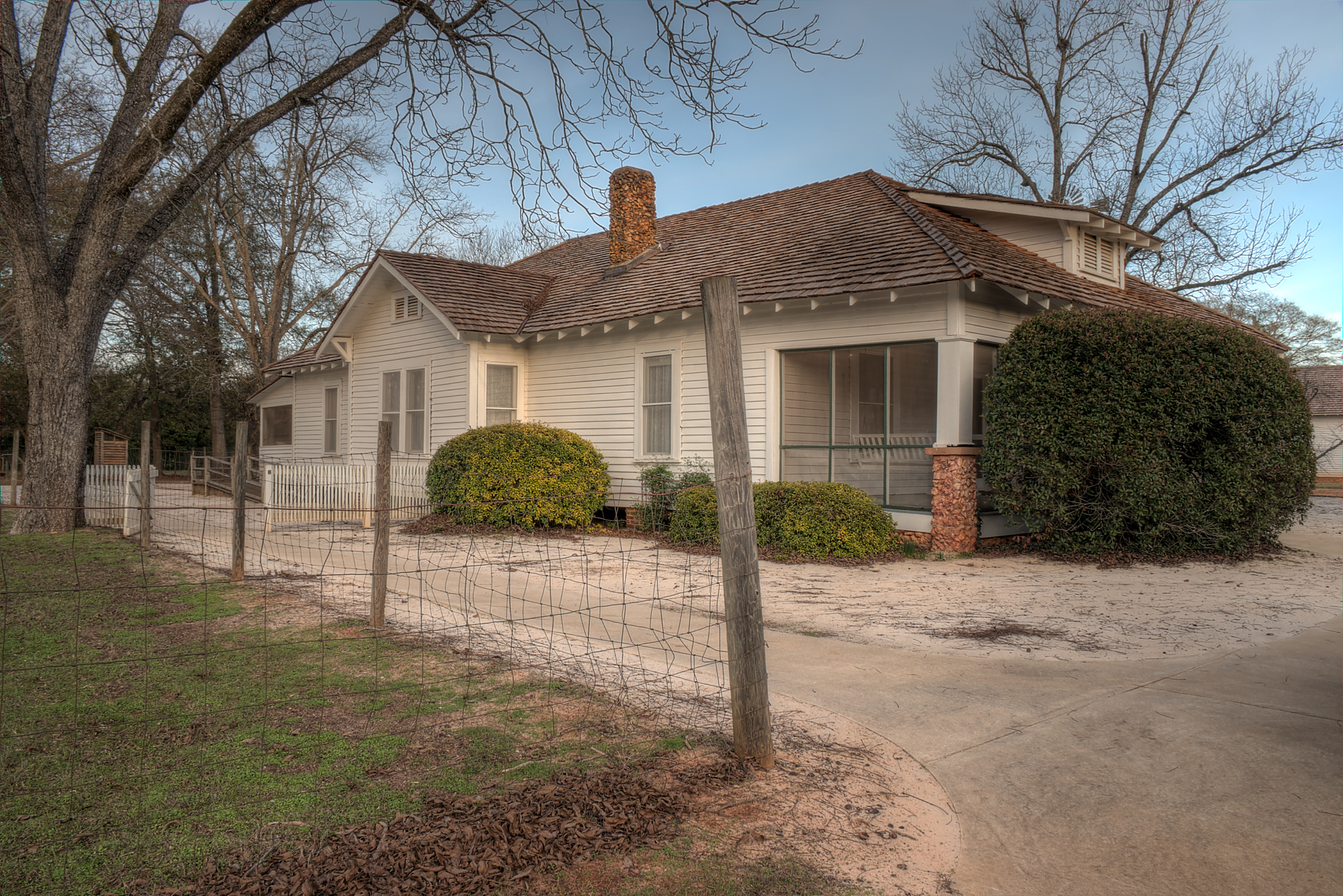
Earl and Lillian Carter home

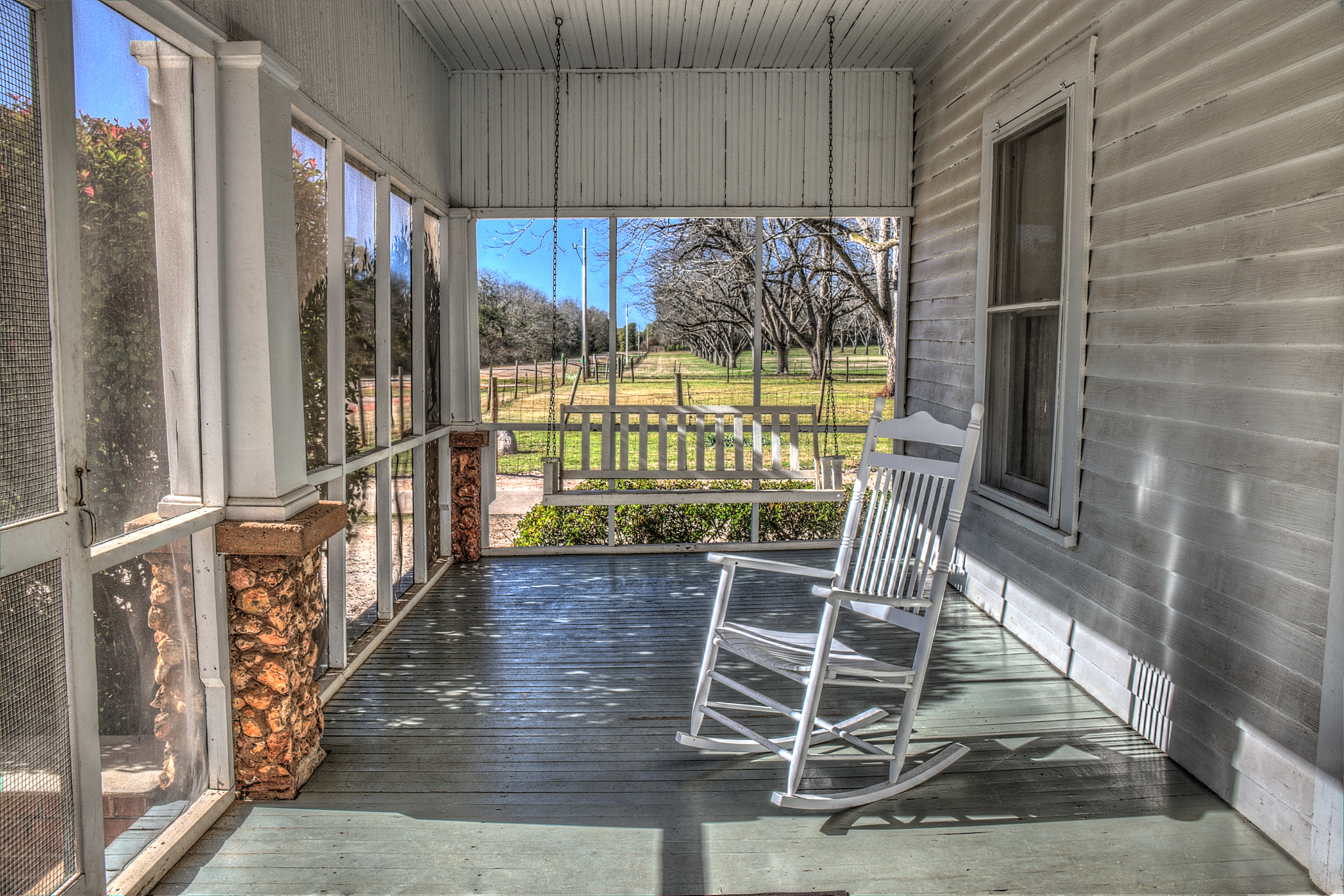
Detail of front porch

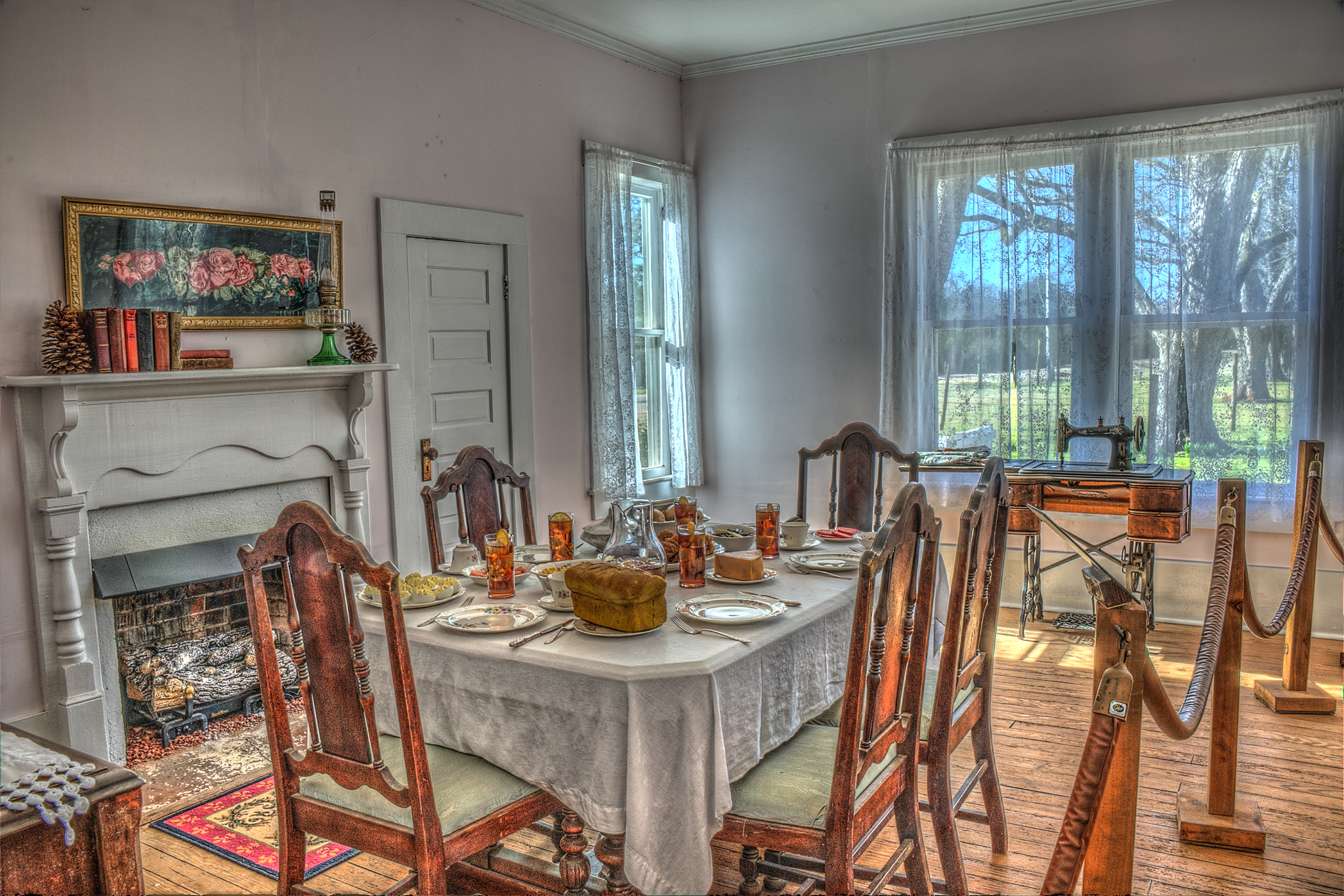
Detail of dining room

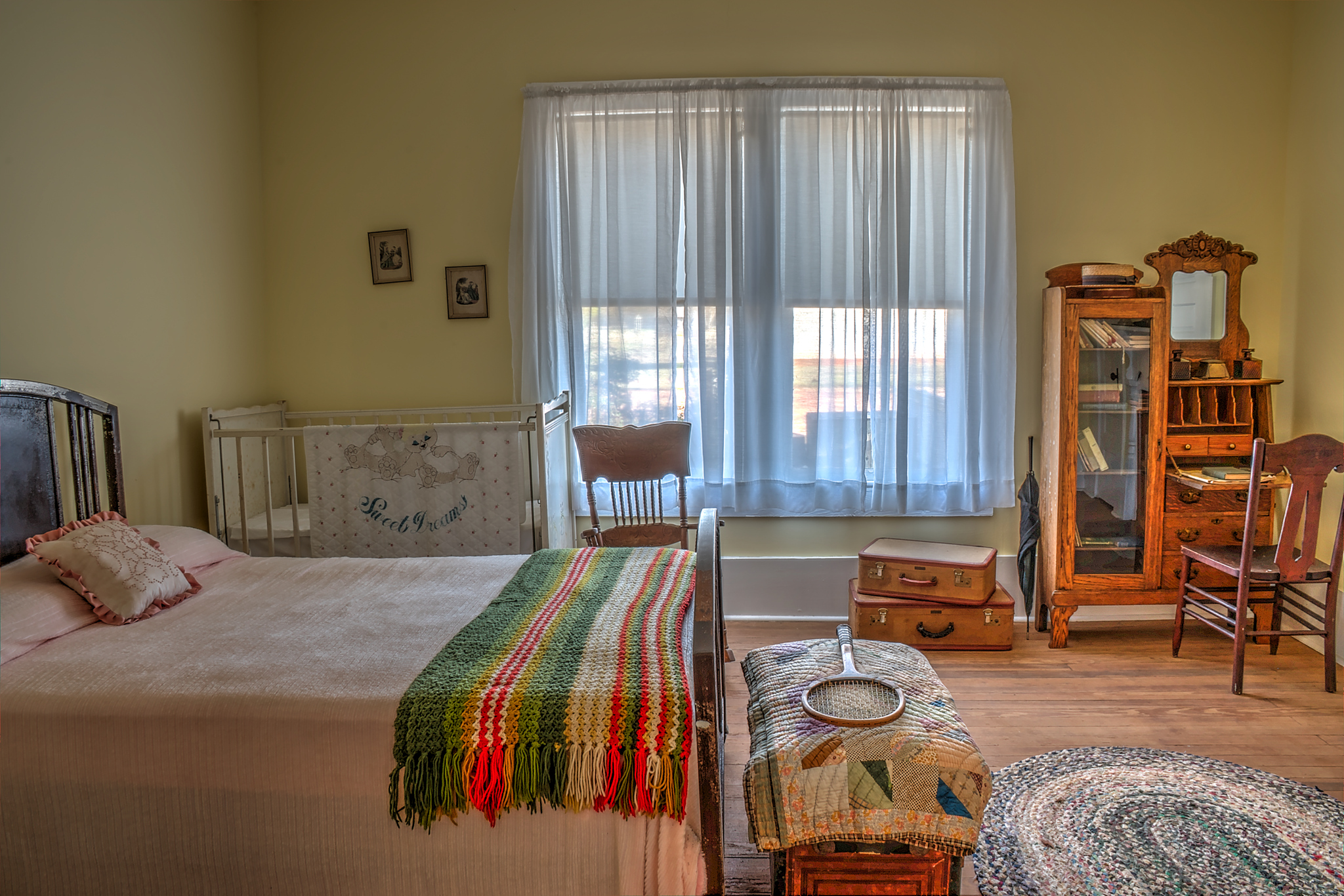
Detail of bedroom

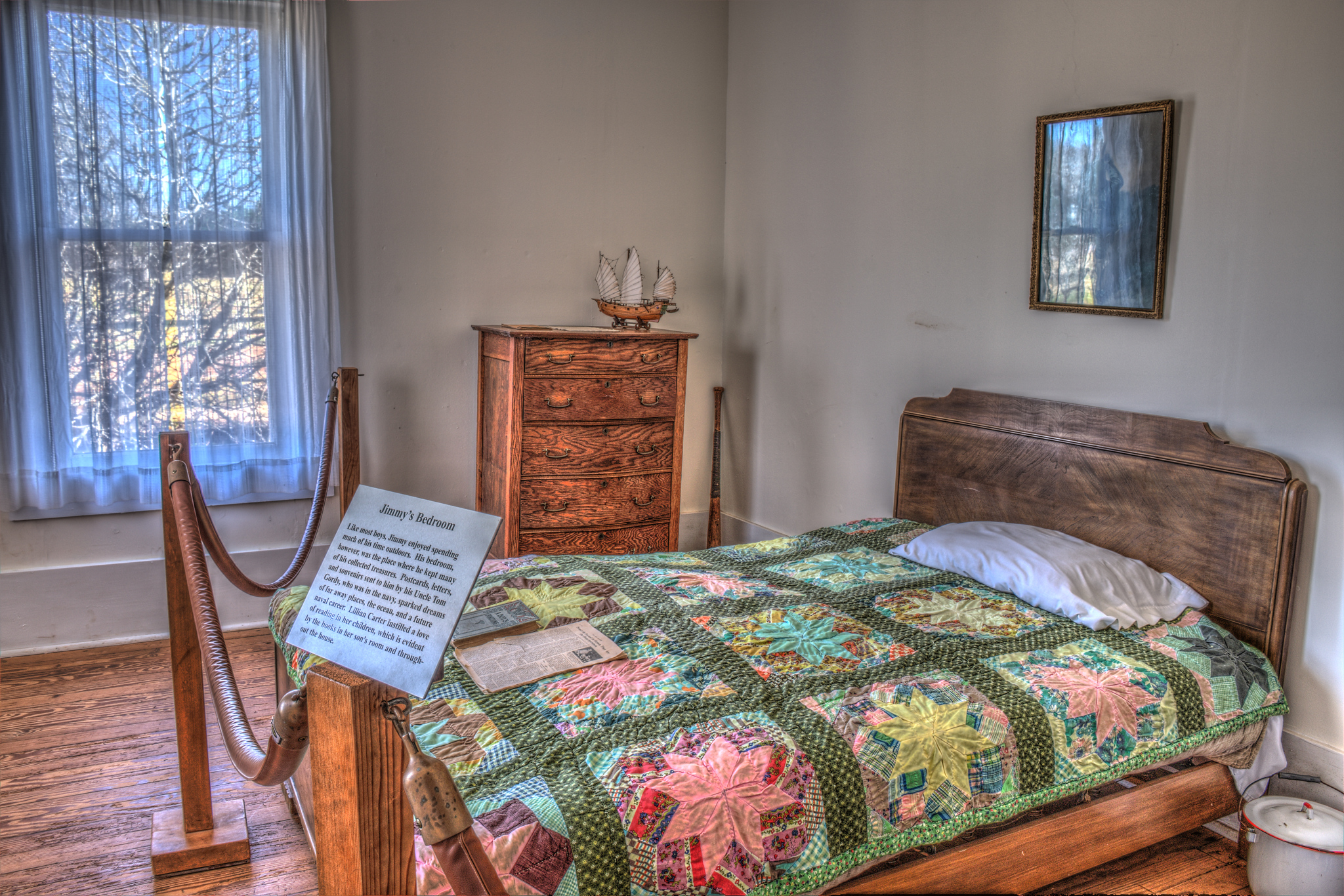
Detail of bedroom
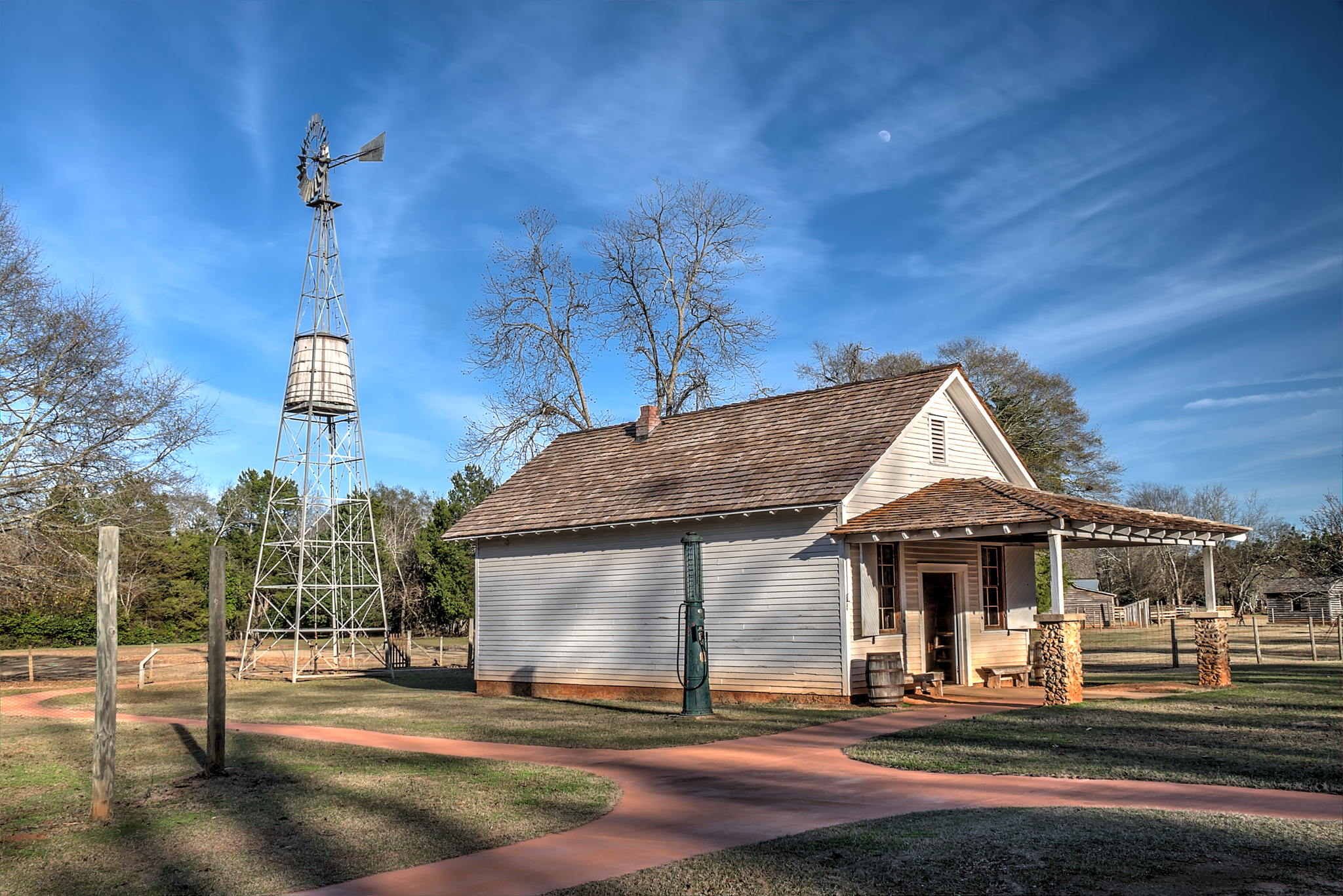
Carter family country store

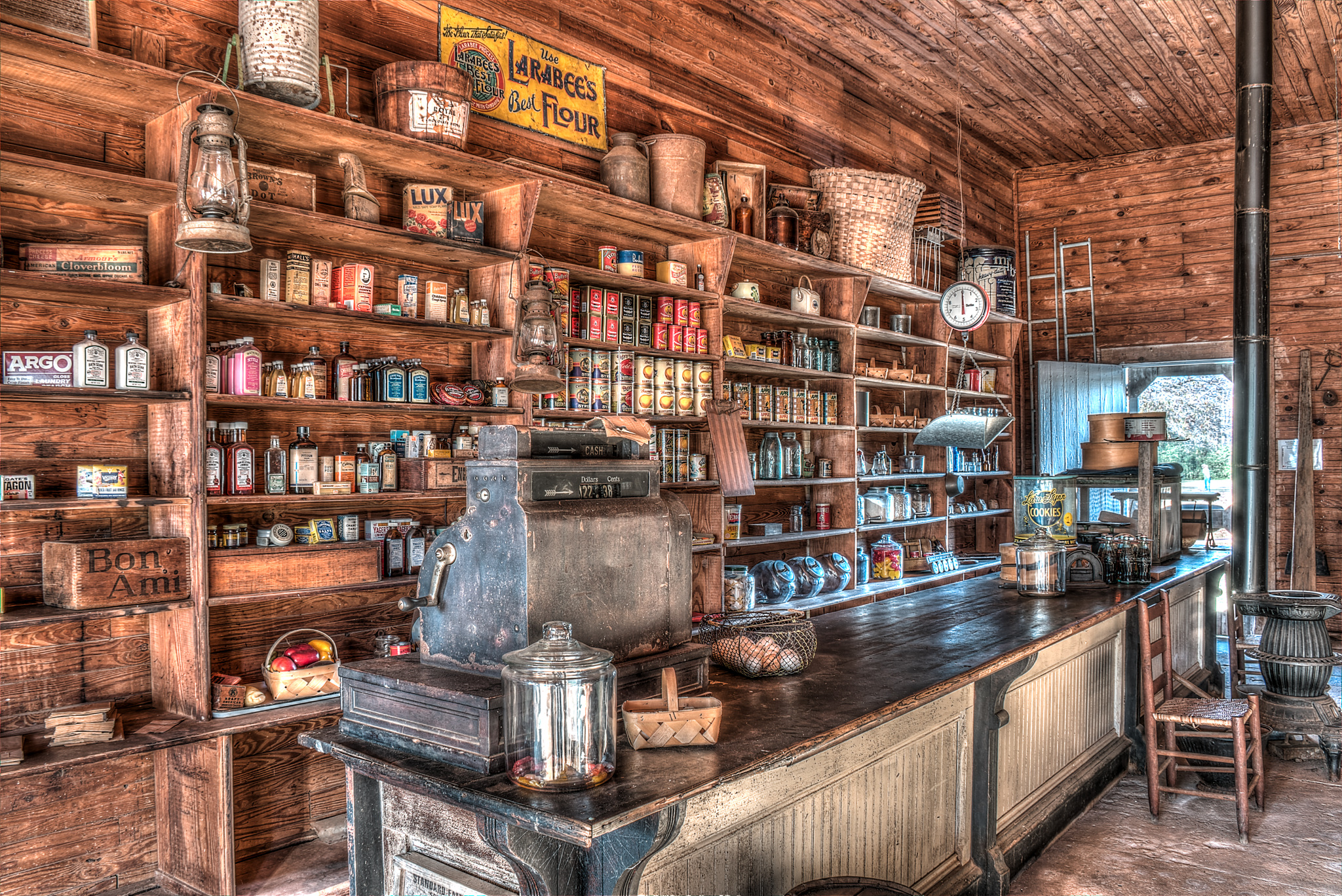
Detail of country store

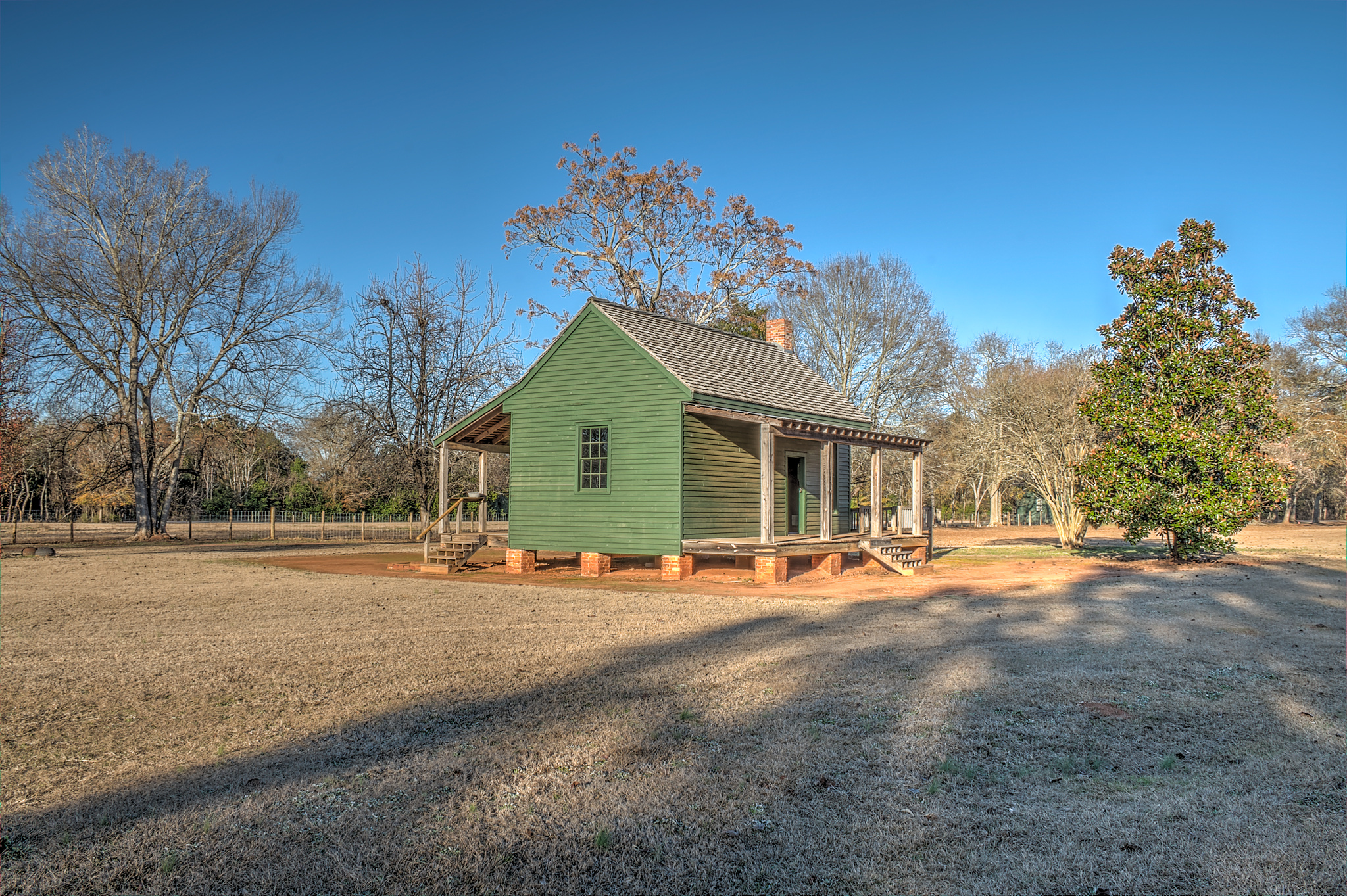
Rachel and Jack Clark's tenant house

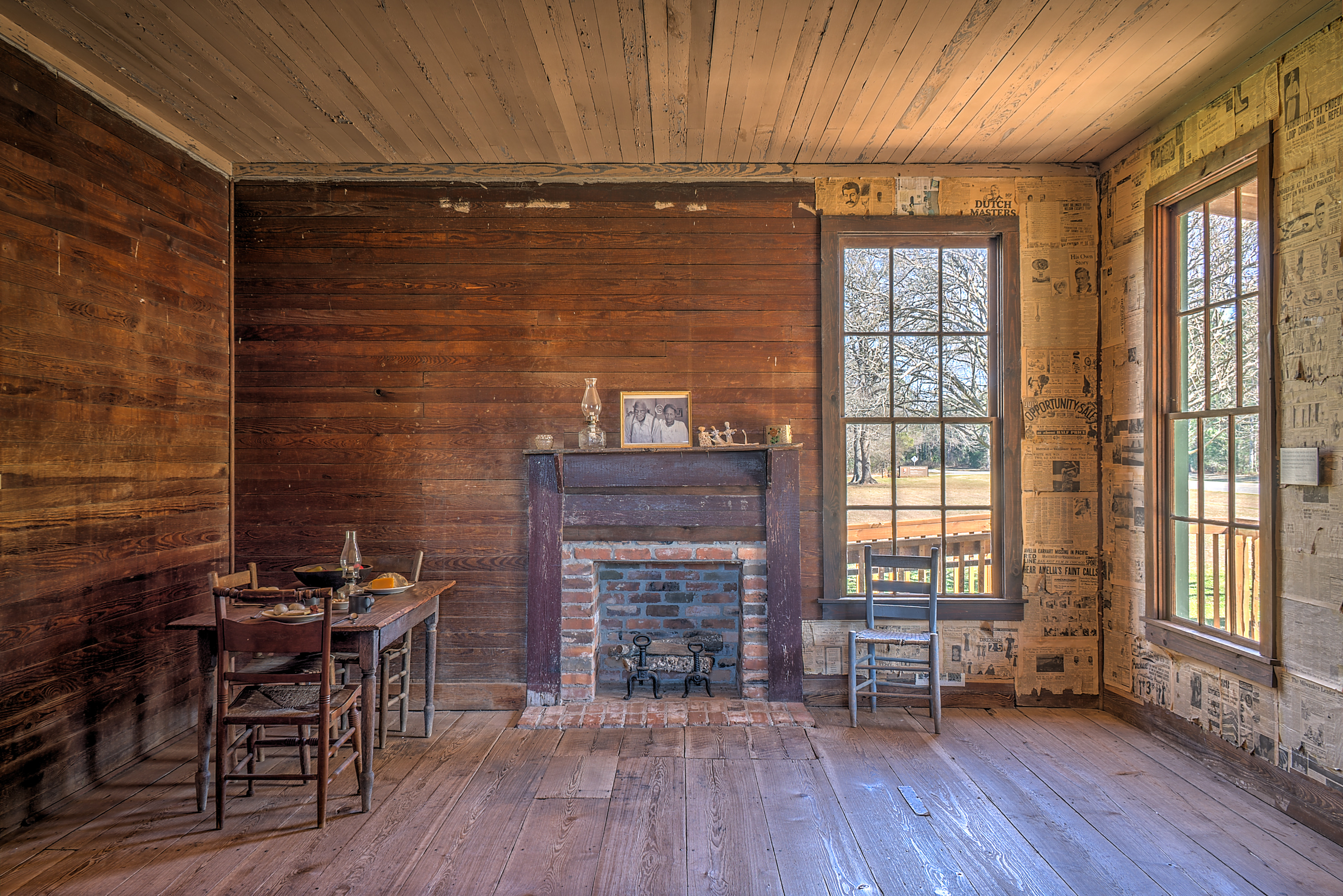
Tenant house, main room

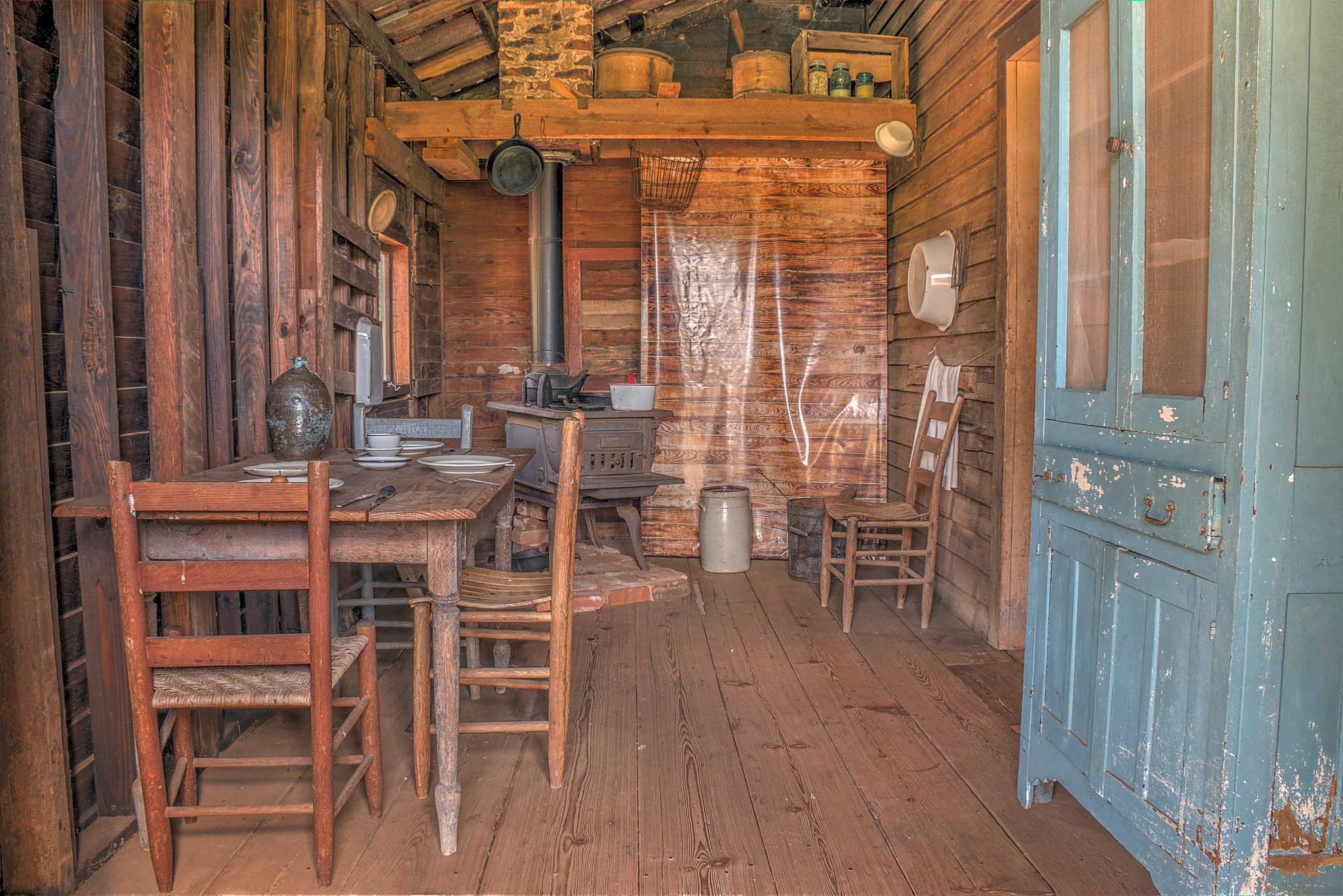
Tenant house, kitchen

Jules The Cat

=== Jimmy and Rosalynn Carter's home, gardens and burial site ===
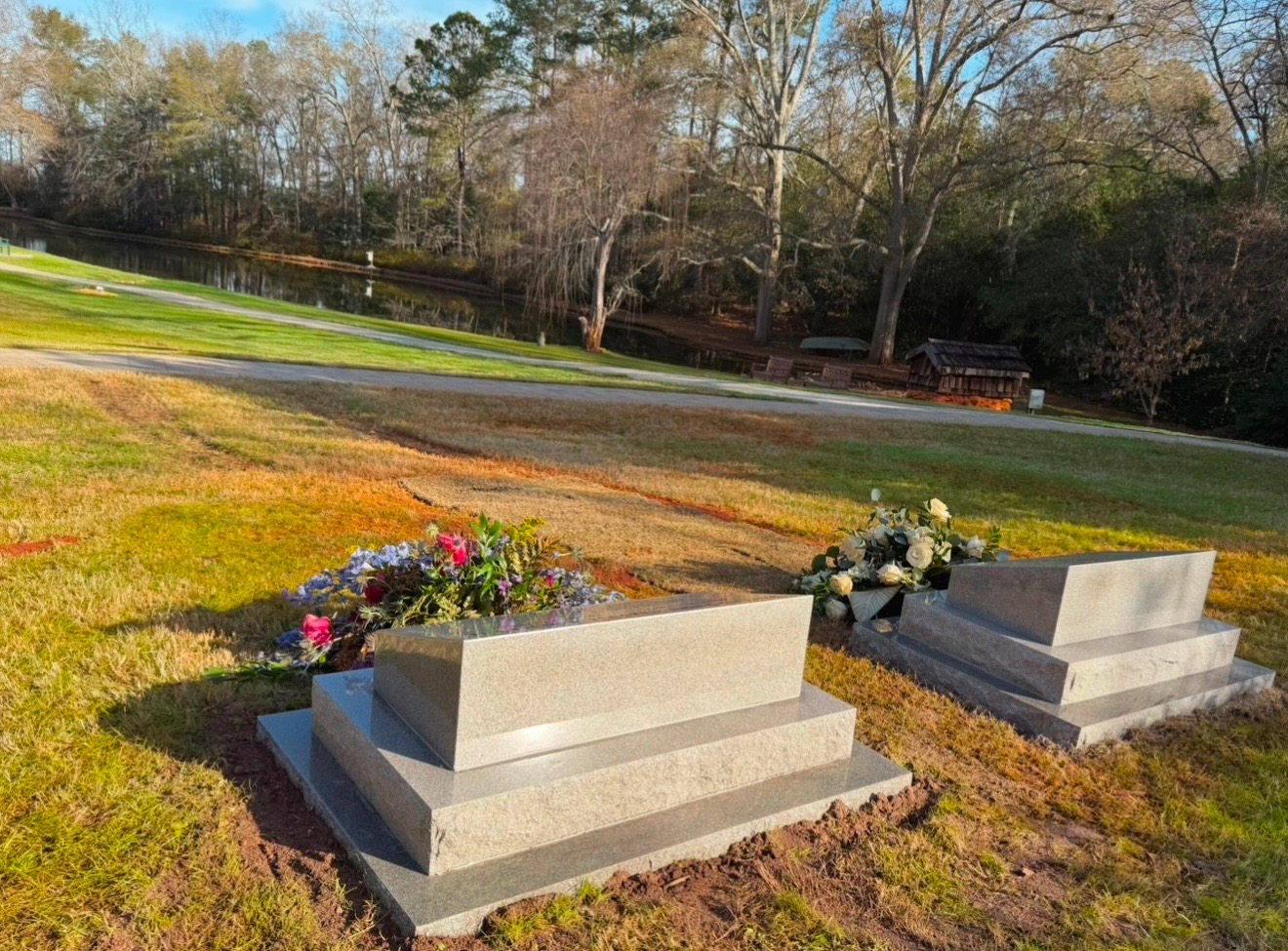
Jimmy and Rosalynn Carter's gravesite

== See also ==
- List of residences of presidents of the United States
- Presidential memorials in the United States
- List of burial places of presidents and vice presidents of the United States
