= List of people diagnosed with pancreatic cancer =

People diagnosed with P.C.: This is an alphabetical list of notable people who have been diagnosed with pancreatic cancer. Boldfaced names were alive as of August 2025.

- Shirley Abrahamson (1933–2020; aged 87), American judge and 25th chief justice of the Wisconsin Supreme Court.
- Dorothy Arnold (1917–1984; aged 66), American actress.
- Charles Arnt (1906–1990; aged 83), American actor.
- Brian Barczyk (1969–2024; aged 54), American YouTuber, reptile enthusiast and zookeeper.
- Syd Barrett (1946–2006; aged 60), English musician and co-founder of Pink Floyd.
- Count Basie (1904–1984; aged 79), American jazz pianist and bandleader.
- Jack Benny (1894–1974; aged 80), American comedian and entertainer.
- John Berardino (1917–1996; aged 79), American actor and baseball player.
- Joseph Bernardin (1928–1996; aged 68), American cardinal, archbishop of Cincinnati and later Chicago.
- Ruschell Boone (1975–2023; aged 48), Jamaican-born American television journalist.
- Bobby Bowden (1929–2021; aged 91), American college football coach for the Florida State Seminoles (1976–2009).
- Wernher von Braun (1912–1977; aged 65), German aerospace engineer and later the lead designer of the American rocket Saturn V.
- Mary Ward Brown (1917–2013; aged 95), Alabama short story writer and memoirist.
- Frank Caprio (1936–2025; aged 88), American judge and politician.
- Madeleine Carroll (1906–1987; aged 81), British-American actress and humanitarian.
- Billy Carter (1937–1988; aged 51), brother of former President of the United States Jimmy Carter.
- Gloria Carter Spann (1926–1990; aged 63), sister of Jimmy Carter.
- James Earl Carter Sr. (1894–1953; aged 58), father of Jimmy Carter.
- Ruth Carter Stapleton (1929–1983; aged 54), American Christian evangelist, sister of Jimmy Carter.
- Geneviève Castrée (1981–2016; aged 35), French-Canadian musician, illustrator and wife of Phil Elverum.
- Johnny Clegg (1953–2019; aged 66), English-born South African musician.
- Hank Cochran (1935–2010; aged 74), American country singer.
- Manny Coto (1961–2023; aged 62), Cuban television producer and writer.
- William R. Cotter (1926–1981; aged 55), American congressman.
- Joan Crawford (c.1906–1977; aged 69–73), American actress.
- Richard Crenna (1926–2003; aged 76), American actor.
- D'Angelo (1974–2025; aged 51), American singer-songwriter and multi-instrumentalist.
- Chuck Daly (1930–2009; aged 79), American basketball head coach, member of NBA Hall of Fame.
- Rocky De Witt (1959–2025; aged 66), American Politician
- Carol Doherty (1942–2025; aged 82), American Politician
- Donna Douglas (1932–2015; aged 82), American actress.
- Umberto Eco (1932–2016; aged 84), Italian professor and novelist (The Name of the Rose, Foucault's Pendulum).
- Jim Edgar (1946–2025; aged 79) American politician who served as governor of Illinois
- Vince Edwards (1928–1996; aged 68), American actor.
- Ralph Eggleston (1965–2022; aged 56), American art director and animator.
- Ralph Ellison (1913–1994; aged 81), American writer, winner of National Book Award for Invisible Man.
- Ann-Margaret Ferrante (1972–2025; aged 53), American politician
- **Nayana Ferguson** (born 1973), co-founder and CEO of Anteel Tequila.
- Art Fleming (1924–1995; aged 70), American actor and television presenter (Jeopardy!).
- Eddie Foy Jr. (1905–1983; aged 78), American actor.
- Anne Francis (1930–2011; aged 80), American actress.
- Aretha Franklin (1942–2018; aged 76), American singer and pianist ("Respect", "(You Make Me Feel Like) A Natural Woman").
- Bonnie Franklin (1944–2013; aged 69), American actress (One Day at a Time).
- **Colin Friels** (born 1952), Australian actor (Water Rats, Darkman).
- Peggy Ann Garner (1932–1984; aged 52), American actress.
- Willie Garson (1964–2021; aged 57), American actor (Sex and the City, Hawaii Five-0, Stargate SG-1).
- Ben Gazzara (1930–2012; aged 82), American actor.
- Bob Gibson (1935–2020; aged 84), American baseball pitcher.
- Dizzy Gillespie (1917–1993; aged 75), American bebop jazz trumpeter and bandleader.
- Alfred G. Gilman (1941–2015; aged 74), American pharmacologist and biochemist.
- Ruth Bader Ginsburg (1933–2020; aged 87), Associate Justice of the Supreme Court of the United States.
- Eleonora Giorgi (1953–2025; aged 71), Italian actress.
- Oliver "Power" Grant (1970–2026; aged 55), entrepreneur, manager of the Wu-Tang Clan.
- Fred Gwynne (1926–1993; aged 67), American actor.
- Terry Hall (1959–2022; aged 63), English musician and singer (The Specials, The Colourfield, Fun Boy Three).
- Lorraine Hansberry (1930–1965; aged 34), American playwright (A Raisin in the Sun).
- Sir Rex Harrison (1908–1990; aged 82), English actor.
- Alcee Hastings (1936–2021; aged 84), American congressman and judge.
- Richard Hatch (1945–2017; aged 71), actor (Battlestar Galactica).
- Frank Herbert (full name: Frank Patrick Herbert, Jr.) (1920-1985; aged 65), American author (Dune).
- Bill Hicks (1961–1994; aged 32), American comedian and musician.
- Gregory L. Hillhouse (1955-2014; aged 59), American chemist.
- Rob Hirst (1955–2026; aged 70), Australian rock musician.
- Drake Hogestyn (1953–2024; aged 70), American Actor known for Days of our Lives
- Michael Houser (1962–2002; aged 40), American musician and founder of the band Widespread Panic.
- Sir John Hurt (1940–2017; aged 77), English actor.
- **Eric Idle** (born 1943), English actor and comedian.
- Eiko Ishioka (1938–2012; aged 73), Japanese costume designer and art director.
- Satoru Iwata (1959–2015; aged 55), Japanese businessman, video game programmer and chief executive officer of Nintendo.
- Susan Saint James (1946-2026; aged 80) American Actress
- Joe Jackson (1928–2018; aged 89), American talent manager and patriarch of the Jackson family.
- Steve Jobs (1955–2011; aged 56), American entrepreneur, business magnate and chief executive officer of Apple.
- "Joe the Plumber" (Samuel Joseph Wurzelbacher, 1973–2023; aged 49), American conservative activist and commentator.
- Wilko Johnson (1947–2022; aged 75), English guitarist and singer-songwriter (Dr. Feelgood).
- Quincy Jones (1933–2024; aged 91), American music producer.
- Robert Katzmann (1953–2021; aged 68), United States circuit judge.
- Tim Keller (1950–2023; aged 72), American pastor, theologian, and Christian apologist.
- Irrfan Khan (1967–2020; aged 53), Indian Hollywood and Bollywood actor.
- Humphry Knipe (1941–2023; aged 81), sociologist, history writer and actor.
- Dmitri Kolker (1968–2022; aged 54), Russian physicist.
- Satoshi Kon (1963–2010; aged 46), Japanese film director and animator.
- Karl Lagerfeld (1933–2019; aged 85), German fashion designer, creative director of Chanel.
- Fiorello La Guardia (1882–1947; aged 64), American politician, mayor of New York City.
- Fernando Lamas (1915–1982; aged 67), Argentine-American actor and director.
- Michael Landon (1936–1991; aged 54), American actor (Bonanza, Little House on the Prairie, Highway to Heaven).
- Sheila Jackson Lee (1950–2024; aged 74), American politician, congresswoman from Texas.
- John Lewis (1940–2020; aged 80), American civil rights activist, politician, and Democratic Congressman from Georgia.
- Roger Lloyd-Pack (1944–2014; aged 69), English actor (Only Fools and Horses, The Vicar of Dibley, Harry Potter, Doctor Who).
- Charlie Louvin (1927–2011; aged 83), American country music singer.
- René Magritte (1898–1967; aged 68), Belgian surrealist artist.
- Henry Mancini (1924–1994; aged 70), American film composer, conductor, pianist and flautist.
- Benoit Mandelbrot (1924–2010; aged 85), Polish-born French and American mathematician.
- Joseph Mar Thoma (1931–2020; aged 89), Malankara Metropolitan.
- Kenneth Mars (1935–2011; aged 75), American actor.
- Dame Clare Marx (1954–2022; aged 68), British surgeon.
- Marcello Mastroianni (1924–1996; aged 72), Italian film director.
- Hazel McCallion (1921–2023; aged 101), Canadian politician, longtime Mayor of Mississauga, Ontario (1978–2014).
- Marian McCargo (1932–2004; aged 72), American actress and champion tennis player.
- Frank McGarvey (1956–2023; aged 66), Scottish professional footballer (Scotland National Team, Celtic, St Mirren).
- Margaret Mead (1901–1978; aged 76), American cultural anthropologist (Coming of Age in Samoa).
- **Maria Menounos** (born 1978), Greek-American journalist, television presenter and actress (Extra, E! News, Eurovision Song Contest 2006).
- Nargis (1929–1981; aged 51), Indian actress.
- Benjamin Orr (1947–2000; aged 53), American musician and co-founder of the rock band The Cars.
- Billy Paul (1934–2016; aged 81), American soul singer ("Me and Mrs. Jones").
- Wolfgang Pauli (1900–1958; aged 58), Austrian pioneer of quantum physics, winner of Nobel Prize.
- Randy Pausch (1960–2008; aged 47), American educator.
- Luciano Pavarotti (1935–2007; aged 71), Italian operatic tenor.
- Brock Peters (1927–2005; aged 78), American actor.
- Wolfgang Petersen (1941–2022; aged 81), German film director (Das Boot, Air Force One).
- Webb Pierce (1921–1991; aged 70), American honky-tonk vocalist.
- Nat Polen (1914-1981; aged 66), American Actor.
- Pete Postlethwaite (1946–2011; aged 64) English actor.
- Harve Presnell (1933–2009; aged 76), American actor.
- Ray Price (1926–2013; aged 87), American country music singer.
- Juliet Prowse (1936–1996; aged 60), Indian-American dancer and actress.
- Sam Rayburn (1882–1961; aged 79), American politician and longest-serving Speaker of the U.S. House of Representatives.
- Donna Reed (1921–1986; aged 65), American actress.
- Harry Reid (1939–2021; aged 82), American politician and lawyer who served as Senate Majority Leader.
- Alan Rickman (1946–2016; aged 69), English actor and director (Harry Potter, Die Hard, Love Actually).
- Sally Ride (1951–2012; aged 61), American astronaut and physicist.
- Pernell Roberts (1928–2010; aged 82), American actor.
- Denise Robertson (1932–2016; aged 83), British writer, television broadcaster and agony aunt (Breakfast Time, This Morning).
- Richard Roundtree (1942–2023; aged 81), American actor, best known as the detective John Shaft in film and television.
- Andy Rourke (1964–2023; aged 59), British musician and bassist (The Smiths).
- **Ben Sasse** (born 1972), American Republican Senator from Nebraska and former University of Florida president
- Simone Signoret (1921–1985; aged 64), French actress.
- Felix Silla (1937–2021; aged 84), Italian actor and stuntman.
- Jay Sigel (1943–2025; aged 81), American golfer.
- Elisabeth Sladen (1946–2011; aged 65), English actress (Doctor Who, The Sarah Jane Adventures, Coronation Street, Z-Cars).
- Mickey Spillane (1918–2006; aged 88), American crime novelist (detective Mike Hammer).
- Jerry Springer (1944–2023; aged 79), American broadcaster, journalist, actor and politician (Jerry Springer, Judge Jerry).
- Patrick Swayze (1952–2009; aged 57), American actor (Dirty Dancing, Ghost, Donnie Darko).
- Richard Sterban,(1943; age 82) American Country singer
- Kane Tanaka (1903–2022; aged 119), Japanese supercentenarian. Diagnosed at age 45.
- Sir Denis Thatcher (1915–2003; aged 88), British businessman and husband of Prime Minister Margaret Thatcher.
- Dyanne Thorne (1936–2020; aged 83), American actress.
- Mary Ellen Trainor (1952–2015; aged 62), American actress.
- Alex Trebek (1940–2020; aged 80), Canadian television personality and presenter (Jeopardy!).
- Linda Tripp (1949–2020; aged 70), American civil servant.
- Fernando Valenzuela (1960–2024), Mexican professional baseball player and announcer.
- Gianluca Vialli (1964–2023; aged 58), Italian professional football player and manager.
- Simon Warr (1953–2020), British teacher for languages
- Roger Williams (1924–2011; aged 87), American popular music pianist.
- Keenan Wynn (1916–1986; aged 70), American actor.
- Shelly Yachimovich (born 1960), Israeli former opposition leader.
- Irving Younger (1932–1988; aged 55), American lawyer, law professor, judge and writer.

== See also ==
- Category:Deaths from pancreatic cancer – over 1,000 notable names listed
