= SCSB =

SCSB may refer to:

- Shanghai Commercial and Savings Bank, a Taiwanese commercial bank
- Shelby County State Bank, a bank based in Iowa
- Sumter County School District (Alabama)
- Sumter County School District (Florida)
- Sumter County School District (Georgia)
