= Peanut Lolita =

Brand of liqueur

- Type: Liqueur
- Manufacturer: Continental Distilling
- Proof (US): 53
- Ingredients: Whiskey and peanut

Peanut Lolita is the name of a thick whiskey and peanut-based liqueur produced in the 1960s and 1970s. The liquor was produced by Continental Distilling in Linfield, Pennsylvania.

== History ==
The label for Peanut Lolita features a belly dancing woman in a 1970s Persian-inspired design. It was sold as a nutty dessert alcohol, sweet and gritty in texture. Peanut Lolita alcohol was 53 proof.

Billy Carter was the official spokesperson for this liqueur while his brother Jimmy Carter held presidential office.

== See also ==
- Brown Bomber (cocktail)
- Peanut liqueur
