= Lillian Gordy Carter =

American nurse, mother of Jimmy Carter (1898–1983)

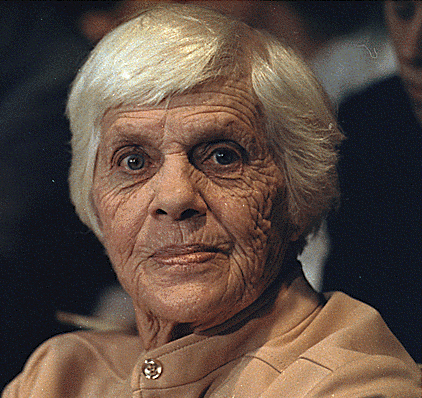
- Carter in 1979
- Born: Bessie Lillian Gordy; August 15, 1898; Richland, Georgia, U.S.
- Died: October 30, 1983 (aged 85); Americus, Georgia, U.S.
- Occupation: Nurse
- Political party: Democratic
- Spouse: James Earl Carter Sr. (m. 1923; died 1953)
- Children: Jimmy; Gloria; Ruth; Billy
- Relatives: Jack Carter (grandson); Amy Carter (granddaughter); Jason Carter (great-grandson); Berry Gordy (first cousin once removed)

Bessie Lillian Gordy Carter (née Gordy; August 15, 1898 – October 30, 1983) was an American nurse. She is most known as the mother of Jimmy Carter, who served as the 39th president of the United States from 1977 to 1981. She was also known for her contributions as a Peace Corps volunteer in India and for writing two books during her son’s presidency.

== Nurse and mother ==
Carter was born Bessie Lillian Gordy on August 15, 1898, in Richland, Georgia, to James Jackson Gordy and Mary Ida Nicholson Gordy. Her father's paternal half-brother Berry Gordy I was the grandfather of Motown Records founder Berry Gordy. She volunteered to serve as a nurse with the U.S. Army in 1917 but the program was canceled. Instead, she worked for the US Post Office at Richland before moving to Plains, Georgia in 1920 where she was accepted as a trainee at the Wise Sanitarium before completing her nursing degree at the Grady Memorial Hospital School of Nursing in Atlanta, Georgia in 1923. Lillian's family initially disapproved of her choice of a career in nursing, but she continued her training and became very successful, earning the respect of both the black and white communities. "Miss Lillian", as she was often known, allowed black people to enter her home through the front door, rather than through the back door as was the social norm, and would often have them in her living room for casual conversation just as she would a white neighbor. These conversations would even continue after her husband Earl was to arrive home expecting the guests to depart.

Lillian Carter said that the strongest influence on her liberal views was her father, James Jackson Gordy, who operated a Post Office in Lillian's hometown of Richland and was always cordial and often dined with the black workers. It was very unusual in the early 20th century, but Lillian decided that she would follow her father's example.

She met businessman James Earl Carter and married him immediately after her graduation. The couple had four children: Jimmy (1924–2024), Gloria (1926–1990), Ruth (1929–1983), and Billy (1937–1988). While she theoretically retired from nursing in 1925, in reality she worked as what was then called a nurse practitioner both for the hundreds of employees back in her husband's businesses and for members of the Plains community. While a religious woman, Carter was not a regular attender of church services. After some sisters at the local church organized a mission trip to Africa, Carter became upset saying that there was plenty to be done in the US before traveling to another country. She coordinated her own Bible study at home on Sunday mornings while the rest of the family attended church.

After the death of her husband from pancreatic cancer, Lillian Carter left for Auburn University where she assumed the role of housemother of Kappa Alpha Order, a fraternity of 100 members at the time. She served in that role from 1956 to 1962. A year after completing her service at Auburn, Carter managed a nursing home in Blakely, Georgia.

Carter later became a social activist, working for desegregation and providing medical care to African Americans in Plains, Georgia.

== Peace Corps volunteer ==
In 1966, at the age of 68, Carter applied for the Peace Corps and was the oldest to ever apply at the time. After completing a psychiatric evaluation, she received three months of training and was sent to India where she worked at the Godrej Colony 30 miles (48 km) from Mumbai. She worked there for 21 months; she aided patients with leprosy. Emory University established the Lillian Carter Center for International Nursing in honor of her work in India. The Atlanta Regional Office of the Peace Corps has named an award in her honor for volunteers over 50 who make the biggest contribution.

== Presidential mother ==
When Jimmy Carter decided to run for president, his mother was one of the first people he told. He was initially regarded as a dark horse candidate for the Democratic Party nomination for President.

Lillian Carter was well known as "Miss Lillian" and she published two books during his presidency: Miss Lillian and Friends and Away from Home: Letters to my Family, both published in 1977. The latter book was a collection of letters to her family sent when she was in India for the Peace Corps. In 1977, Andy Warhol created a portrait of her, and it has since been on display at the Carter Center in Atlanta, Georgia.

"Miss Lillian" was a favorite of the press for her Southern charm and down-to-earth manner. For reporters and interrogators alike, she always had a warm, sassy response for every question. One biographer recalls a story about an encounter between Carter and a reporter from New York who flew to Plains to meet her during her son's 1976 campaign to become the U.S. president:

Miss Lillian greeted her, and said "Welcome to Plains! It's so nice to see you! Would you like some lemonade? How was your journey? Your dress is beautiful"; pouring out the Southern hospitality. And the reporter jumped right in on Miss Lillian and said "Now Miss Lillian, your son's running for president and said he'll never tell a lie now, as a mother, are you telling me he's never told a lie?" And she goes "oh, Jimmy tells white lies all the time!" the reporter said "Tell me what you mean: what is a 'white lie'?" And Miss Lillian said "Remember when I said 'Welcome to Plains and how good it is to see you'. That's a white lie."

In 1977, Lillian Carter appeared in a cameo as herself in the made-for-TV movie Lucy Calls the President starring Lucille Ball.

When son Billy's beer business had its ribbon-cutting ceremony, a friend questioned Carter on whether or not she would attend. She remarked: "I attended Jimmy's inauguration, didn't I?"

Together with vice president Walter Mondale, Lillian Carter was head of the U.S. delegation to the funeral of Yugoslav president Josip Broz Tito.

== Final years and death ==
Shortly after her eldest son left office in January 1981, Carter was diagnosed with breast cancer. While her cancer was in remission in April 1983, her younger daughter, Ruth Carter Stapleton, was diagnosed with pancreatic cancer and died on September 26, 1983, aged 54. Carter herself succumbed to breast cancer that metastasized to the bone a month later on October 30, 1983, at age 85 in Americus, Georgia. Her three surviving children were by her side at her death. Carter was buried in a simple six-minute ceremony at Lebanon Church Cemetery, on November 1, 1983, next to her husband, who died 30 years before her.

In addition to her husband and daughter, two more of her children, Gloria Carter Spann and Billy Carter, and her grandson, Dr. S. Scott Stapleton, also died from pancreatic cancer. The former president was diagnosed with melanoma in 2015, at the age of 90. He survived the cancer and stopped treatments in March 2016. In 2010, he had a severe stomach ache which was mistaken as pancreatic cancer. He was a fundraiser and booster for research into a cure for the disease.

In 2001, a major nursing center in Plains was dedicated in Lillian Carter's honor by Jimmy Carter in recognition of her first years of service to the community as a nurse. In 2011, she was inducted into the Georgia Women of Achievement.
