= Thad M. Jones =

American politician (1901–1972)

Thaddeus Marion Jones

Member of the Georgia House of Representatives
- In office 1955–1962
- Preceded by: James Earl Carter Sr.

Personal details
- Born: November 17, 1901 Sumter County, Georgia, U.S.
- Died: January 24, 1972 (aged 70) Plains, Georgia
- Citizenship: American
- Party: Democratic
- Spouse: Irene Jobes
- Children: Irene Zorn
- Parent(s): Thomas Marion Jones and Maggie Louis Cooker Jones
- Profession: politician, businessman

Thad M. Jones (November 17, 1901 – January 24, 1972) was an American politician. He served as a Democratic member of the Georgia House of Representatives.

== Life and career ==
Jones was born in Sumter County, Georgia. He attended Plains High School.

Jones served in the Georgia House of Representatives from 1955 to 1962.

Jones died on January 24, 1972, with an apparently self-inflicted gunshot wound, at the age of 70.
