= Brown Bomber (disambiguation) =

Brown Bomber is the nickname of American heavyweight boxer Joe Louis.

Brown Bomber may refer to:

- Brown Bomber (cocktail)
- Andrew Fahie (born 1970), former Premier of the British Virgin Islands
