= Peanut liqueur =

- Type: Liqueur
- Ingredients: Peanuts, rum

Peanut liqueur is a liqueur produced with peanuts.

== History ==
Rum is often used in the preparation of peanut liqueur, in which the spirit is infused with peanuts. Some varieties are produced with cream and simple syrup. Castries Crème is a brand of peanut liquor based upon rum that has the flavor of peanuts, brown sugar and cinnamon. Some peanut-infused vodkas are also produced, such as Van Gogh Vodka, NutLiquor and Peacasso. Peanut Lolita was an unpopular peanut-based dessert whiskey that was manufactured and sold in the United States in the 1960s until 1970s.

== See also ==
- Brown Bomber (cocktail)
- List of liqueurs
- Peanut butter whiskey – peanut-flavored whiskey
- Peanut Lolita
