= Kenya Health Work Force Project =

The Kenya Health Work Force Project is a project to move health informatics in Kenya from a paper system to a computer-based database. They are being assisted by the Georgia Tech Research Institute and the Lillian Carter Center for International Nursing. It is being led by Martha Rogers.
