= Lillian Carter Center for International Nursing =

Organizational unit at Emory University

The Lillian Carter Center for International Nursing is an organizational unit of Emory University named after Lillian Gordy Carter, President Jimmy Carter's mother, in honor of her humanitarian work in India. It was established in 2001.

== History ==
In 2001, the organization was established and dedicated to Lillian Gordy Carter. The organization has been involved with the Georgia Tech Research Institute and the Kenya Health Work Force Project in automating health information systems in Kenya and Zimbabwe.
