= James Earl Carter Sr. =

American politician (1894–1953)

Member of the Georgia House of Representatives from Sumter County
- In office January 12, 1953 – July 22, 1953
- Preceded by: Charles Burgamy
- Succeeded by: Thad M. Jones

Personal details
- Born: James Earl Carter; September 12, 1894 Arlington, Georgia, U.S.
- Died: July 22, 1953 (aged 58) Plains, Georgia, U.S.
- Cause of death: Pancreatic cancer
- Party: Democratic
- Spouse: Lillian Gordy (m. 1923)
- Children: Jimmy; Gloria; Ruth; Billy
- Parents: William Archibald Carter; Nina Pratt
- Profession: Politician; businessman; farmer

Military service
- Allegiance: United States: Georgia
- Branch/service: United States Army; Georgia Army National Guard
- Rank: Sergeant (at end of World War I); Second Lieutenant (Georgia National Guard)
- Battles/wars: World War I (stateside)

James Earl Carter Sr. (September 12, 1894 – July 22, 1953) was an American politician and businessman who represented Sumter County in the Georgia House of Representatives from January 12, 1953, until his death on July 22, 1953. Commonly known as Earl Carter, he was the father of Jimmy Carter, the 39th U.S. president from 1977 to 1981.

== Early life ==
James Earl Carter was born in Arlington, Georgia, on September 12, 1894. He was the fourth of five children born to William Archibald Carter and Nina Pratt. In 1904, after his father was murdered by a business partner — which the nine-year-old Earl witnessed — the Carter family moved to Plains, Georgia. The relocation allowed a supportive uncle to provide guidance to Earl — who was enrolled into the Riverside Military Academy — where he stayed until the completion of 10th grade. Biographer Grant Hayter-Menzies speculated that the sudden death of his father left James with an approach to life that was both conservative and cautious. In a 1980 address to the Democratic National Committee, Jimmy Carter stated that his father had continued a trend set by previous generations of the Carter family by not finishing high school.

After completing 10th grade, Carter worked as a traveling salesman in Texas. He used the profits he made selling flatirons to invest in an ice house and a laundry in Plains.

== Military service ==
In December 1917, Carter enlisted in the United States Army for service in World War I. Initially a private in Company I, 121st Infantry Regiment, he advanced through the ranks to sergeant before being selected for officer training school in August 1918. He completed the course at Camp Lee, Virginia on November 30, 1918. Because the Armistice had occurred earlier in the month, the Army was being reduced in size, so Carter received his commission as a second lieutenant in the Georgia National Guard.

== Business career ==
After his discharge from the Army, Carter opened a grocery store on Main Street in Plains. Work in the low-margin grocery store business prompted Carter to use deceptive tactics to maximize profit. His daughter Gloria recounted his showing her how to make bottles of milk appear fuller than they were by pouring milk in a certain manner. Factors such as weather conditions and the constantly changing price of agricultural commodities resulted in wide swings in the income produced from Carter's agricultural pursuits.

His time as a traveling salesman had already instilled within Carter a strong work ethic. Now, as the owner of a small business, he undertook the routine of working from "sunrise until dark", "Monday morning until Saturday afternoon", before a single evening of partying. Years later, his son remembered that the Saturday night aspects of that routine conflicted with the preferences of his wife.

== Personal life ==
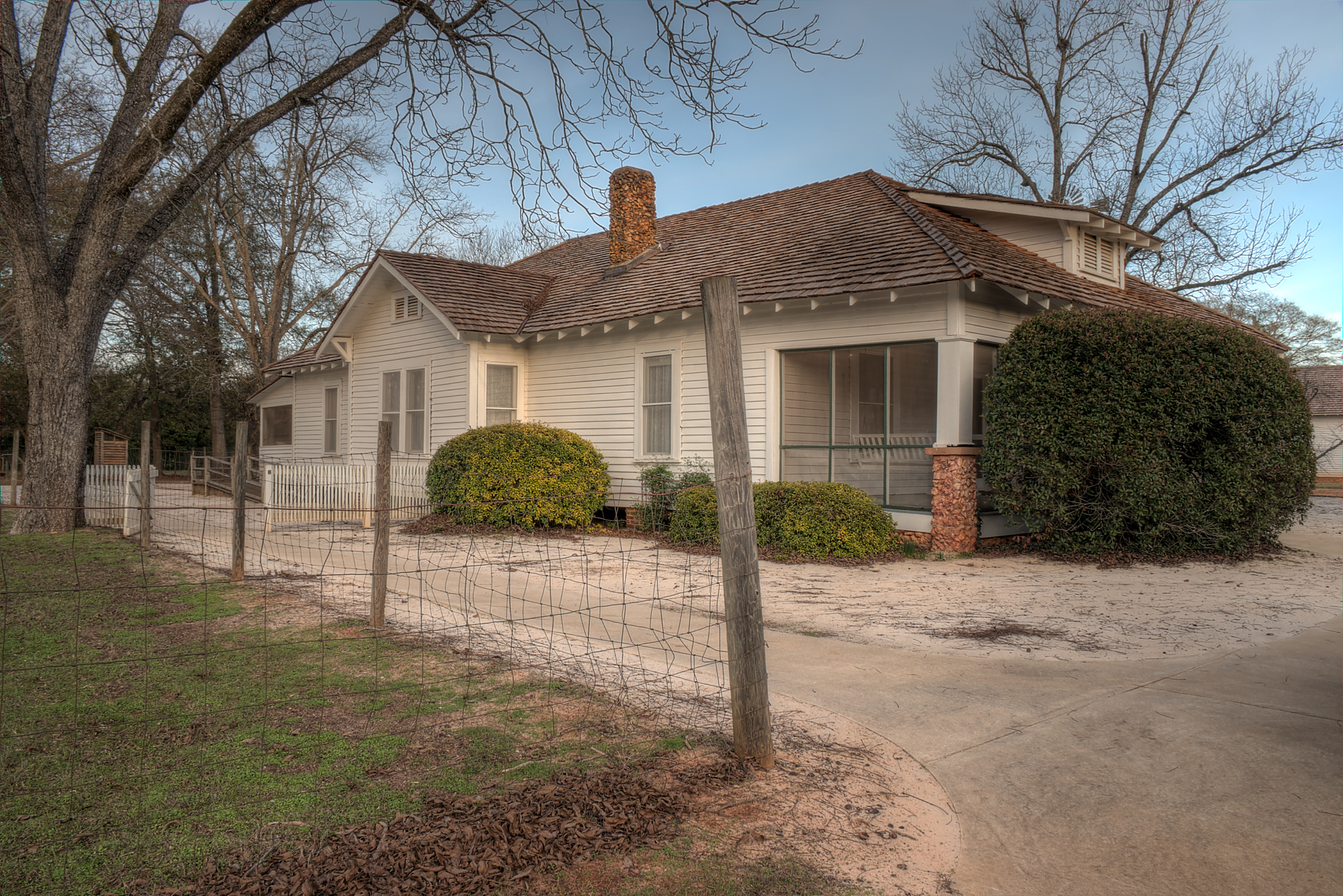
Carter home at the Jimmy Carter National Historical Park

Carter married Lillian Gordy Carter on September 27, 1923, in Plains. According to his son Jimmy, Carter was engaged to another woman at the time of first meeting Lillian and had already planned out the wedding before boarding a train and disappearing for three months. After that time, Carter returned and initiated his courtship of Lillian. Lillian reflected that the couple had to adjust to their different interests, the two having differing political views and reading interests. Carter's reading habits consisted of daily and weekly newspapers, farm journals, Richard Halliburton's The Royal Road to Romance, Arthur Conan Doyle stories of Sherlock Holmes, and the complete set of Tarzan tales by Edgar Rice Burroughs. Carter signed and ordered the material in a sequence, and his eldest son would retain the collection decades after his death. Biographer Beverly Gherman wrote that Carter differed from his wife and children in not having a "love of books" but instead turning to newspapers for reading material. Decades after Carter's death, Lillian reflected on the strength of their relationship: "I have never ceased being lonely for him, but I've never been lonely for anyone else."

By the time his son Jimmy was four years old, Carter had purchased a new home. When he took the children to see the house, he realized that he had left his key behind. A wooden bar allowed only a small space for the windows to open, too small to allow access for an adult. Carter sent Jimmy through the window to open the door. Many years later, President Carter would recollect that the "approval of my father for my first useful act has always been one of my most vivid memories." Around the time Jimmy was 13, the elder Carter became one of the first directors of the Rural Electrification Program, Jimmy recounting that his father learned the importance of political involvement on both a state and national level.

Jimmy later wrote of his father being a strict parent who punished him when he misbehaved, recounting an experience of being whipped by his father after the latter discovered he had taken a penny out of the collection plate at church. The future president wrote that it was the last time he ever stole. Carter would be credited by his elder son with being the person who most shaped his "work habits and ambitions".

== Politics and death ==
Carter was a conservative in his political views. However, his son Jimmy recollected that, "within our family we never thought about trying to define such labels". The elder Carter was also a segregationist.

Initially having supported Franklin D. Roosevelt, Carter opposed implementation of his New Deal when production control programs instituted under the Roosevelt administration included the slaughtering of hogs and plowing of cotton. That evolved into a broader opposition to Roosevelt, and Carter never voted for him in subsequent elections. According to his eldest son, despite his disillusion with Roosevelt, Carter never abandoned the statewide Democratic Party and voted for its candidates in the remaining elections held during his lifetime. However, his opposition to Roosevelt led to a different approach when it came to national politics.

For the 1936 Republican National Convention, Carter assembled his family to huddle around a radio for several hours, and subsequently voted for the party's nominee, Alf Landon, in the general election. Within Georgia, Carter supported Eugene Talmadge in his 1932 gubernatorial bid. Carter's elder son remembered that he "would take his one-ton farm truck to Gene Talmadge's rallies and barbecues, its flat bed covered with straw and loaded down with our neighbors".

After having served on the Sumter County Board of Education, Carter was elected to the Georgia House of Representatives in 1952, as a Democrat. He served briefly, representing Sumter County until his death the following year due to pancreatic cancer on July 22, 1953, at age 58.
