= Jimmy Carter Peanut Statue =

Monument in Plains, Georgia, US

Coordinates: 32°02′30″N 84°23′32″W

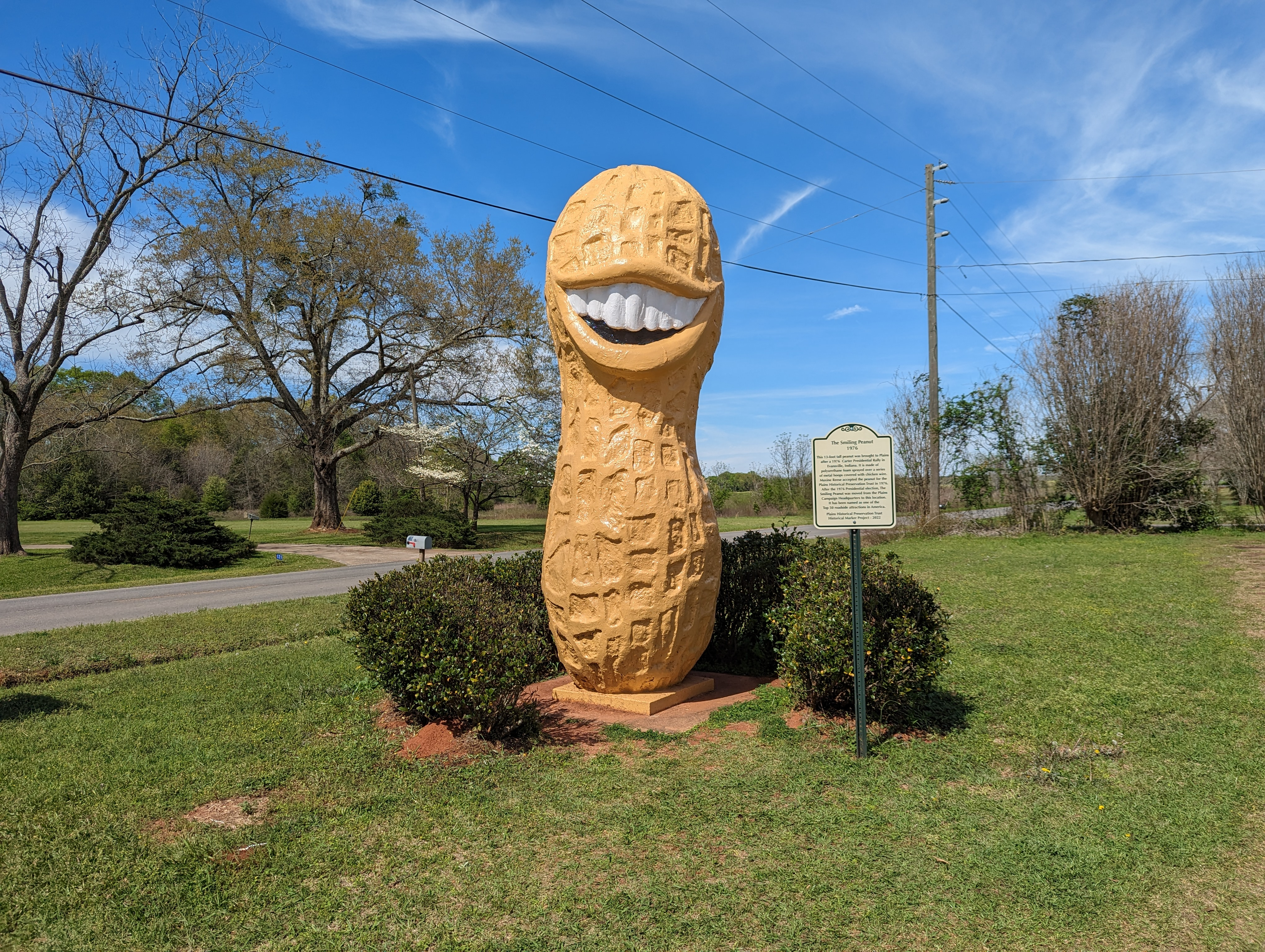
- The statue after a repainting in 2023
- Interactive map of Jimmy Carter Peanut Statue
- Location: Plains, Georgia, United States
- Type: Roadside attraction
- Material: Wooden hoops, chicken wire, aluminum foil, and polyurethane.
- Height: 13 feet (4.0 m)
- Completion date: 1976
- Dedicated to: Jimmy Carter

The Jimmy Carter Peanut Statue is a monument located in Plains, Georgia, United States. Built in 1976, the roadside attraction depicts a large peanut with a big smile, and was built to support Jimmy Carter during the 1976 United States presidential election.

== History ==
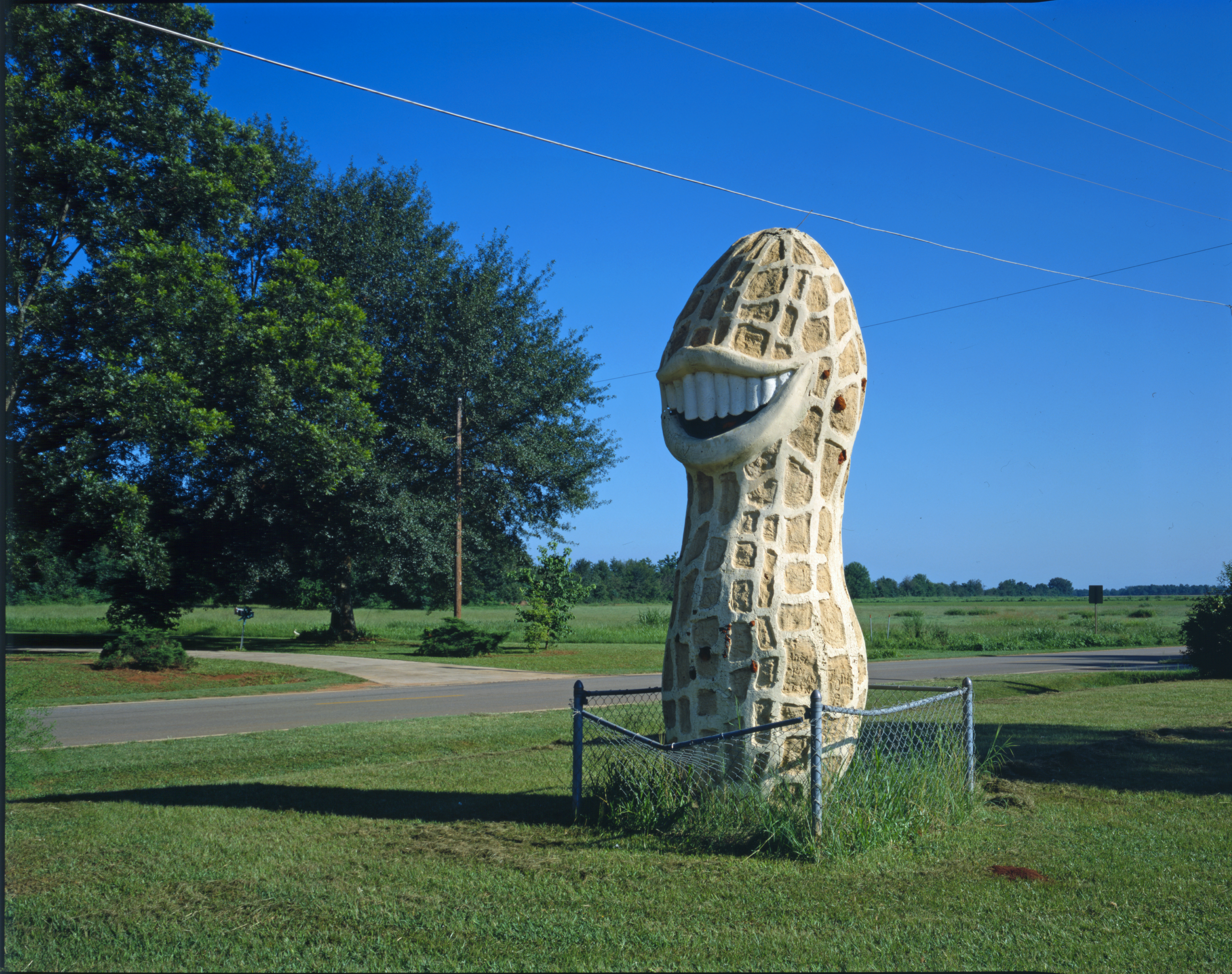
The statue, as it was originally painted, in 1989.

The statue was commissioned by the Indiana Democratic Party during the 1976 United States presidential election to support Democratic candidate Jimmy Carter's campaign through Indiana. The statue, a 13-foot (4.0 m) peanut, references Carter's previous career as a peanut farmer. According to The New York Times, the statue is made of "wooden hoops, chicken wire, aluminum foil, and polyurethane". The peanut features a grin, modeled after Carter's, which he was known for during the campaign. The statue is the second-tallest statue of a peanut in the world, with the "World's Largest Peanut" located several miles away in Ashburn, Georgia. The statue initially was located at the train station in Plains, but in 2000, it was damaged in a car wreck, and after repairs it was moved to an area along Georgia State Route 45, near the Maranatha Baptist Church where Carter was a member and taught Sunday school. At one time, the statue featured a large hole on its rear side, which, according to urban legend, was cut by the United States Secret Service to ensure there were no explosives or assassins in the statue.

== Maintenance and reception ==
Every few years, the statue is re-painted in the shade of "peanut" by Michael Dominik. Jimmy Carter once admitted that he disliked the peanut's smile. In 2023, Jill Stuckey, the superintendent of the Jimmy Carter National Historical Park, claimed that Carter “hates” the statue, which stands on the route between his house and the church he attended weekly. Despite Carter’s alleged feelings towards the statue, it has become a town symbol and roadside attraction. In 2010, Time listed it as one of the Top 50 American Roadside Attractions.

Beginning in 2018, pictures of the statue have been used in internet meme culture, with many pictures of the statue being characterized as cursed images.

== See also ==
- 1976 in art
- List of sculptures of presidents of the United States
- Statue of Jimmy Carter, Atlanta
