= Lillian G. Carter Nursing Center =

Historic Wise Sanitarium, birthplace of Jimmy Carter

Coordinates: 32.0378°N 84.3899°W

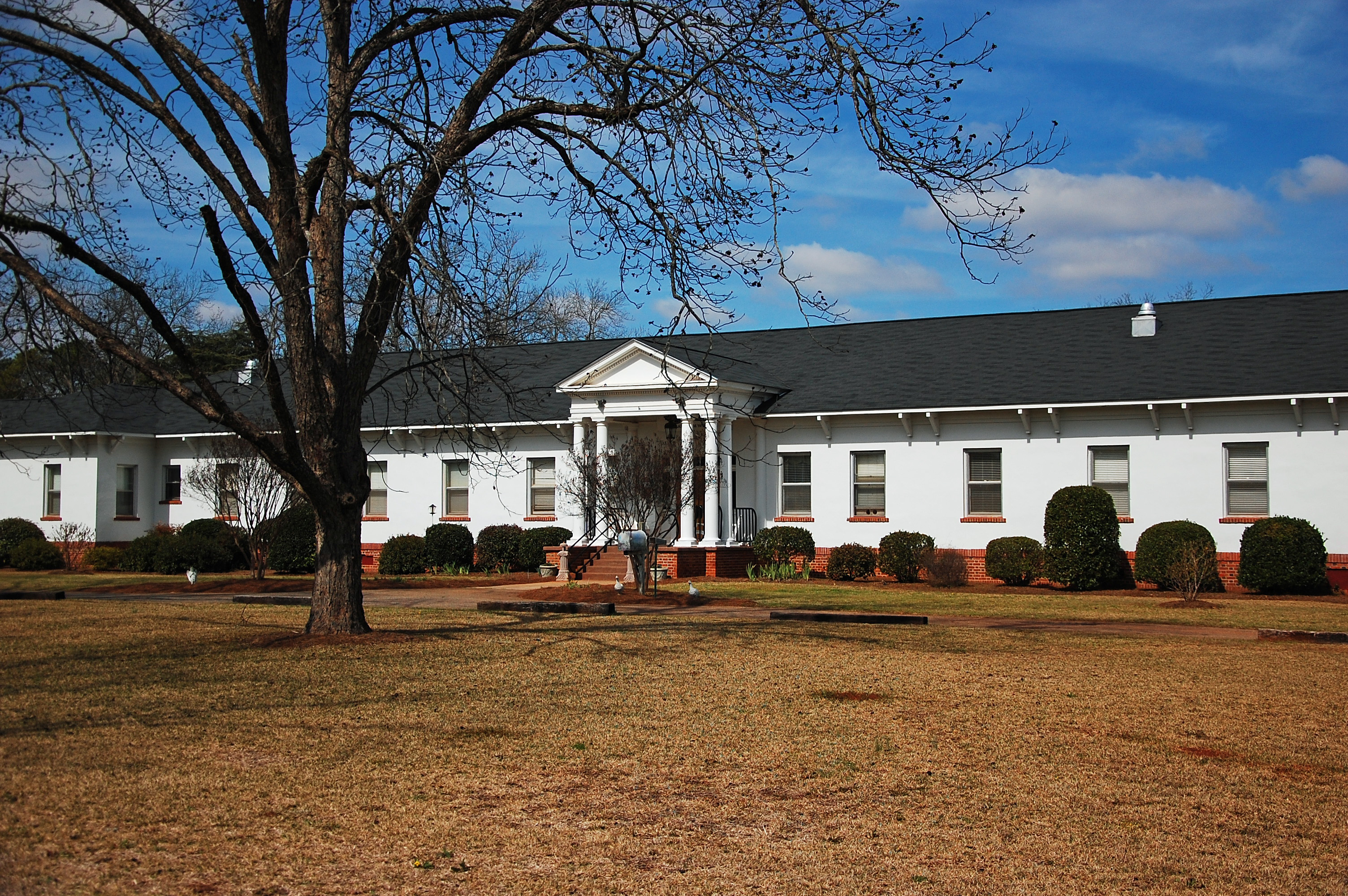
Sanitarium

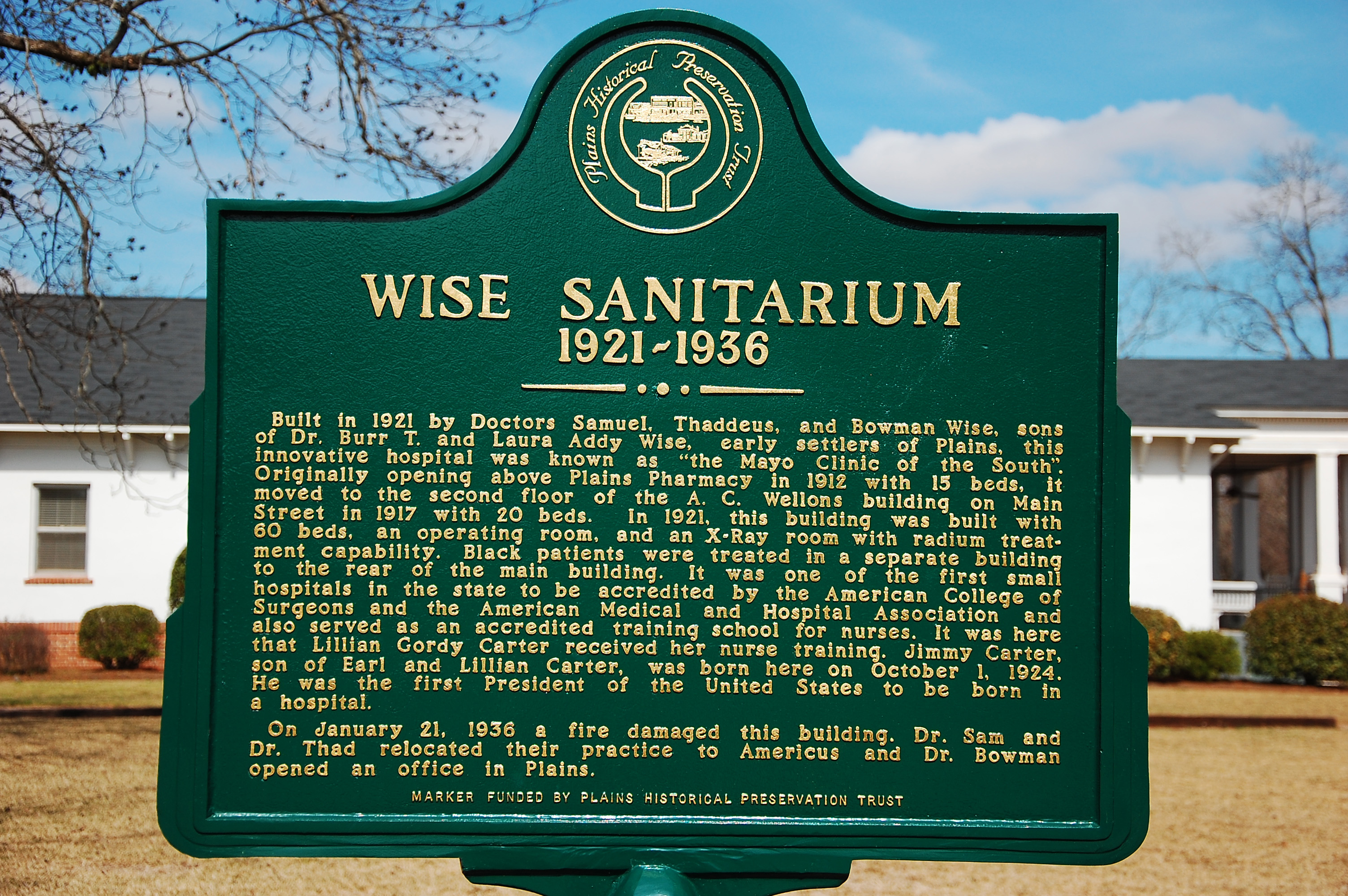
Sign

The Lillian G. Carter Nursing Center, formerly known as the Wise Sanitarium in Plains, Georgia, United States, was a hospital. Currently, it is a nursing care facility, but was the birthplace of former United States President James Earl Carter Jr., who was born there on October 1, 1924, when his mother was working there as a registered nurse. Carter was the first US president to be born in a hospital.

== History ==
Originally built in 1921 by Doctors Samuel, Thaddeus and Bowman Wise, children of early Plains settlers Dr. Burr T. Wise and Laura Addy Wise, the 60-bed sanitarium was one of the first small hospitals in Georgia to be recognized by the American College of Surgeons and the American Medical and Hospital Association. It also served as a training center for nurses. A separate building was attached to the sanitarium for the treatment of African Americans. In 1924, it was the birthplace of the 39th US President Jimmy Carter.

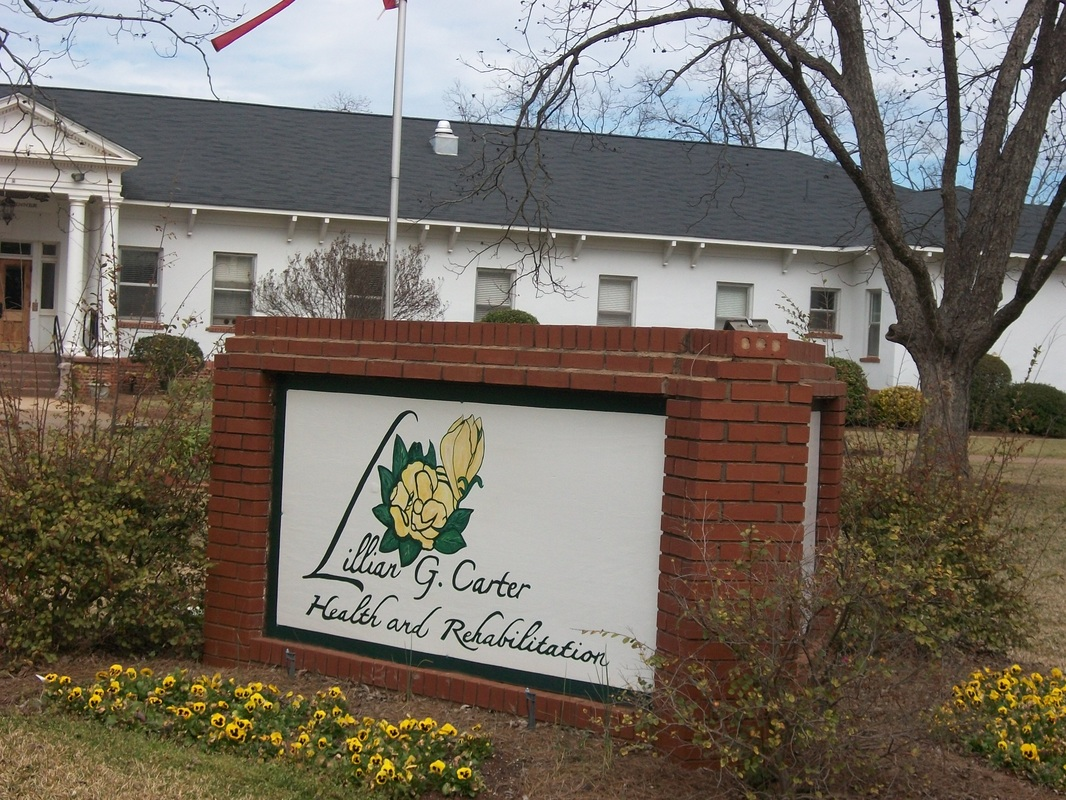
The center in 2012

In 1976, Wise Sanitarium was transformed into Lillian Carter Health and Rehabilitation, named after President Jimmy Carter's mother, Lillian Gordy Carter, who worked at the facility when she gave birth to him there. The facility is a 100-bed skilled nursing facility that provides skilled care including physical, occupational, and speech therapies. It is currently owned by Ethica Healthcare and CHSGA.

== Current use ==
The center continues to be in use as a skilled nursing care facility as of December 2024.
