= Sumter County School District (Georgia) =

School district in Georgia (U.S. state)

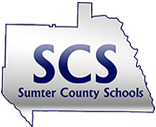

Address
- 100 Learning Lane Americus, Georgia, 31719-8172; United States
- Coordinates: 32.191052°N 83.173971°W

District information
- Grades: Pre-kindergarten – 12
- Superintendent: Walter Knighton
- Accreditation(s): Southern Association of Colleges and Schools; Georgia Accrediting Commission

Students and staff
- Students: 3637 (2023–24)
- Faculty: 265.60 (FTE)
- Student–teacher ratio: 13.69

Other information
- Website: sumterschools.org

The Sumter County School District is a public school district in Sumter County, Georgia, United States, based in Americus. It includes the entire county, and serves the communities of Americus, Andersonville, Cobb, De Soto, Leslie, and Plains.

== History ==
In 2004, Sumter County High School and Americus High School merged, becoming Americus-Sumter County High School. At this time, the South Campus housed grades 10-12 while the North Campus (formerly Sumter County High School) served as the 9th Grade Academy, the Performance Learning Center, and the alternative school.

The school system has reconfigured several times since the 2004 merger. In 2012, the Board of Education voted on, and approved the closing of Cherokee Elementary School. Prior to closing, Cherokee Elementary housed grades Pre-K, Kindergarten, and 1st Grade. Upon closure, these grades were moved to Sarah Cobb Elementary School, and 5th Grade at Sarah Cobb was moved the Staley Middle School. Sarah Cobb housed Grades Pre-K thru four, and Staley Middle housed grades five thru eight. In early 2015, the SCS Board of Education voted on, and approved the first major reconfiguration of school system. During the 2015-16 school term, the former Sarah Cobb Elementary School (which housed grades Pre-K thru four) was changed to Sumter County Early Learning Center, and housed grades Pre-K and Kindergarten. Sumter County Primary School (which housed grades Pre-K thru second), was reconfigured to house only first and second graders. Sumter County Elementary School (which housed grades three thru fifth) was reconfigured to house only third and fourth graders. The former Sumter County Middle School (which housed sixth through eighth graders) was changed to Sumter County Intermediate School, and housed grades five and six. Americus Sumter County High - North Campus (which housed all ninth graders) was changed to Sumter County Middle School, and housed seventh and eighth graders. Staley Middle School (which housed sixth thru eighth graders) was changed to Americus Sumter Ninth Grade Academy, and housed all ninth graders. Americus Sumter County High - South Campus received a name change to Americus Sumter High School. The school system reconfigured once again for the 2016-17 school term, where location changes were made for all Pre-K, Kindergarten, second, and fourth grade students.

The school competes in the AAAA classification in athletics. Before the merger, Americus High School won state championships in football in 1962, 1965, 1974, 1975, 2000, and 2001. NFL player Leonard Pope was a member of the championship teams in 2000 and 2001. Former NFL coaches Chan Gailey and Dan Reeves are graduates and former football players at Americus High.

The superintendent is Walter Knighton.

== Schools ==
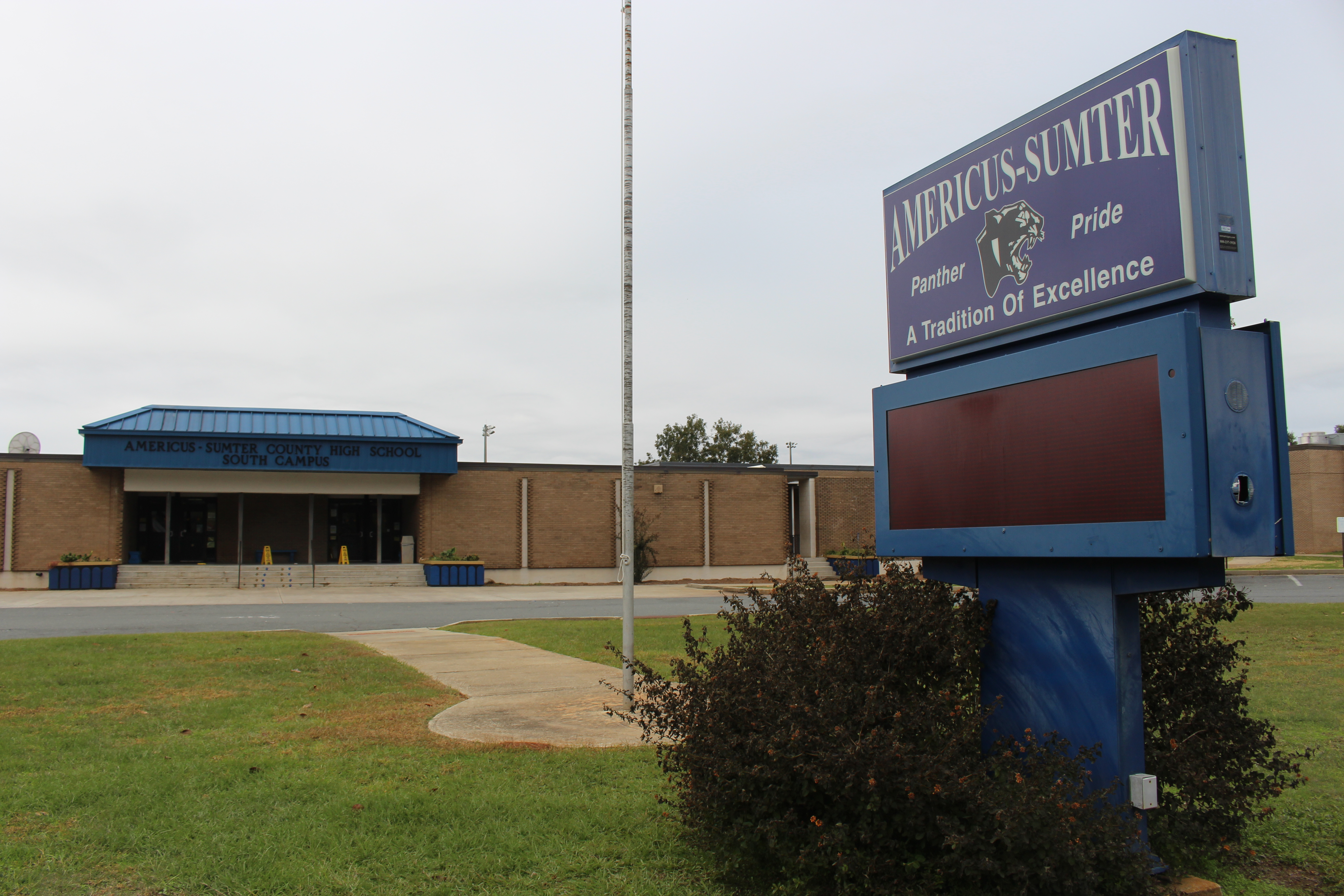
Americus-Sumter County High School in Americus.

The Sumter County School District has one primary school, one elementary school, two middle schools, and two high schools.

=== Primary and Elementary Schools ===
- Sumter County Primary School
- Sumter County Elementary School

=== Middle schools ===
- Sumter County Intermediate School
- Sumter County Middle School

=== High schools ===
- Americus-Sumter High School
- Ignite College and Career Academy
