= Gloria Carter Spann =

American motorcyclist and motorcycling activist

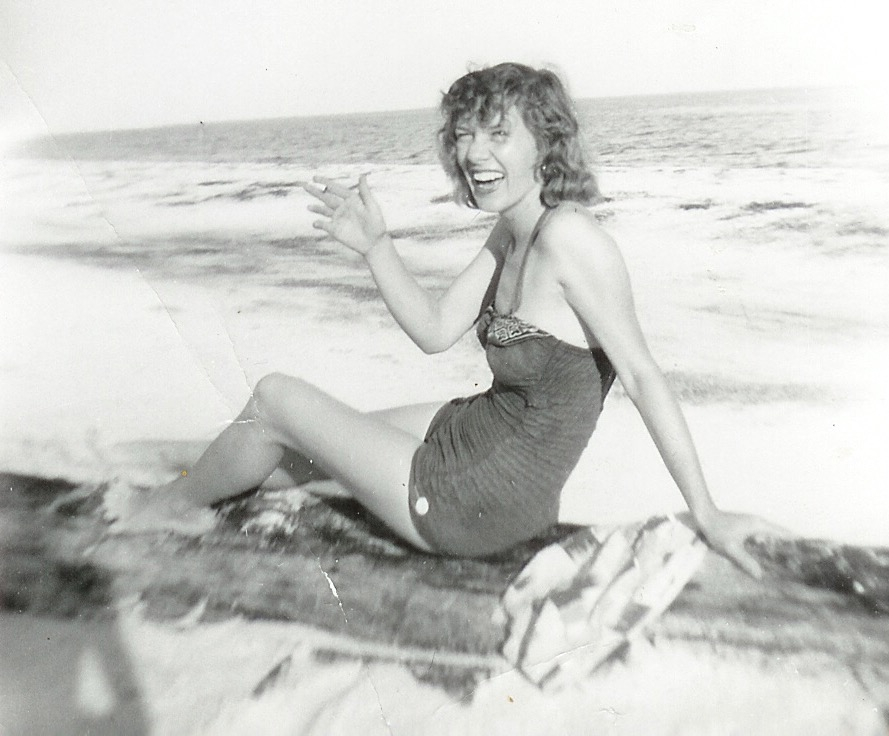
- Spann in the late 1950s
- Born: Gloria Carter; October 22, 1926; Plains, Georgia, U.S.
- Died: March 5, 1990 (aged 63); Americus, Georgia, U.S.
- Resting place: Lebanon Church Cemetery, Plains, Georgia
- Education: Georgia Southwestern State University
- Known for: Sister of Jimmy Carter
- Spouses: William Everett Hardy (m. 1945; ann. 1949); Walter Spann (m. 1950)
- Children: 1
- Parents: James Earl Carter Sr. (father); Bessie Gordy (mother)

Gloria Carter Spann (née Carter; October 22, 1926 – March 5, 1990) was an American motorcyclist and activist. Spann was a younger sister of the 39th president of the United States, Jimmy Carter. She was noted as one of the first women inducted into Harley-Davidson’s 100,000 Mile Club, was named Most Outstanding Female Motorcyclist in 1978 and worked as an activist for motorcycle rights.

== Early years ==
Gloria Carter was the second of four children, and the first daughter born to James Earl Carter, Sr. (1894–1953) and Lillian Gordy Carter (1898–1983) and was two years younger than her brother, Jimmy. When Jimmy was small, he pronounced her name "Go Go", a nickname which stuck. By many accounts, including her mother's, Gloria was the smartest, most interesting, most attractive, most outgoing, and most talented of the Carter children. As children competing for the affections of their parents, the relationship between Spann and the future president was somewhat strained, but the two grew extremely close in their later years. Jimmy shot her with a BB gun after she threw a wrench at him when they were children.

Carter graduated from high school in June 1944 and enrolled in Georgia Southwestern College, where she began to study journalism. Her plans were deferred when she married a war hero, William Everett Hardy, from Americus. The Carters disapproved of the match, as the groom was a former drugstore clerk, not a suitable job for well-to-do families at the time. The marriage produced a son, William Everett (Hardy) Spann (1946–1997). Gloria returned to Georgia in 1949 from Texas, and her father was upset by the brutal beatings Gloria suffered at her husband's hands. With her father's help, Gloria had her marriage annulled in 1949. On December 15, 1950, she married Walter Guy Spann (1925–2012), a farmer from Webster County, Georgia, and he adopted the son of her first marriage. Walter and Gloria Spann had no children of their own together. By all accounts, the two had a very happy, affectionate marriage, which lasted almost 40 years, until her death.

In 1964, Spann resigned from the Baptist Church the Carters belonged to after the church voted not to lift its ban on black people from attending.

== Carter presidency: 1977–1981 ==
Although Spann had some level of fame of her own before Carter's election, she was not forced into the spotlight until then. She was probably the sibling who shunned the spotlight most during her brother's years in office. Before Carter was elected president in 1976, Spann had participated in several campaigns for him. In his bids for the governorship of Georgia, she made countless phone calls and mailed numerous pamphlets on his behalf.

Spann and her husband at a rally

Spann maintained a relatively low profile as she and her husband participated in cross-country cycling on their Harley-Davidson motorcycles. She began cycling around 1967. In 1977, she published a book of her mother's letters detailing her mother's struggles and accomplishments during two years working for the Peace Corps in India. She and Walter were also members of Union Life, a religious brotherhood.

Spann's son caused her great distress. He became a nocturnal wanderer and often disappeared for three or four days at a time, leaving Spann frantic. As her husband made good money, Spann was not required to work, but since her son was continually expelled from schools, she began work as a secretary in order to send him to a private school. She discussed her trouble with her evangelist sister, Ruth Stapleton. At Stapleton's cabin in the mountains, Spann picked up material that encouraged readers to give their problems to God.

William Carter Spann moved to California in 1969, and Gloria cited his troubled life as the main factor that turned her back toward her faith. William Spann often said that his mother rejected him and used this to justify his unconventional behavior. Gloria Carter Spann never saw her son during the last 21 years of her life.

Though William had moved out to California and severed contact with his family, this did not keep him out of the spotlight. During Jimmy Carter's 1976 presidential campaign, William was interviewed in his California jail cell. Of his uncle's success, he said: "He's in the White House, I'm in the big house." Gloria also received a phone call threatening to reveal that "Jimmy Carter's got a nephew in jail" if she did not pay a sum of money to keep the caller quiet. In 1979, Spann was herself arrested for disorderly conduct when she refused to stop playing a harmonica in a McWaffle restaurant in Americus, Georgia.

Spann was one of the first women inducted into Harley Davidson’s 100,000 Mile Club, was named Most Outstanding Female Motorcyclist in 1978, and worked as an activist for motorcycle rights. During their years as motorcyclists, Gloria and her husband became "den mother" and father to the younger riders. The Spanns planted a large garden for bikers each year and canned the vegetables to serve as they often had unexpected guests. Their farmhouse was arranged for multiple cots or sleeping bags. Walter constructed a four-hole outhouse to accommodate bikers who were cruising through the South or headed to the races at Daytona.

== Illness and death ==
On March 5, 1990, Spann died from complications of pancreatic cancer at the age of 63. Her father, sister Ruth Carter Stapleton, and brother Billy Carter, all died of the same disease.

== Sources ==
- https://www.bikerrogue.com/Articles/Bros_Events/goodbye_gloria.htm
- https://web.archive.org/web/20050315170533/https://www.bassharp.com/bspress.htm
- https://web.archive.org/web/20011101131356/https://www.hdfoundation.org/testread/family.html
- Carter Sister Injured on Cycle
- https://www.nytimes.com/1989/12/01/us/jimmy-carter-s-sister-has-pancreas-cancer.html
- https://www.nytimes.com/1990/03/07/obituaries/gloria-carter-spann-ex-president-s-sister-63.html
- Stapleton, Michael (2013). Blood and Alcohol. Bloomington, Indiana: Xlibris Corporation. ISBN 978-1-4836-3410-4.
