= Billy Carter =

American businessman (1937–1988)

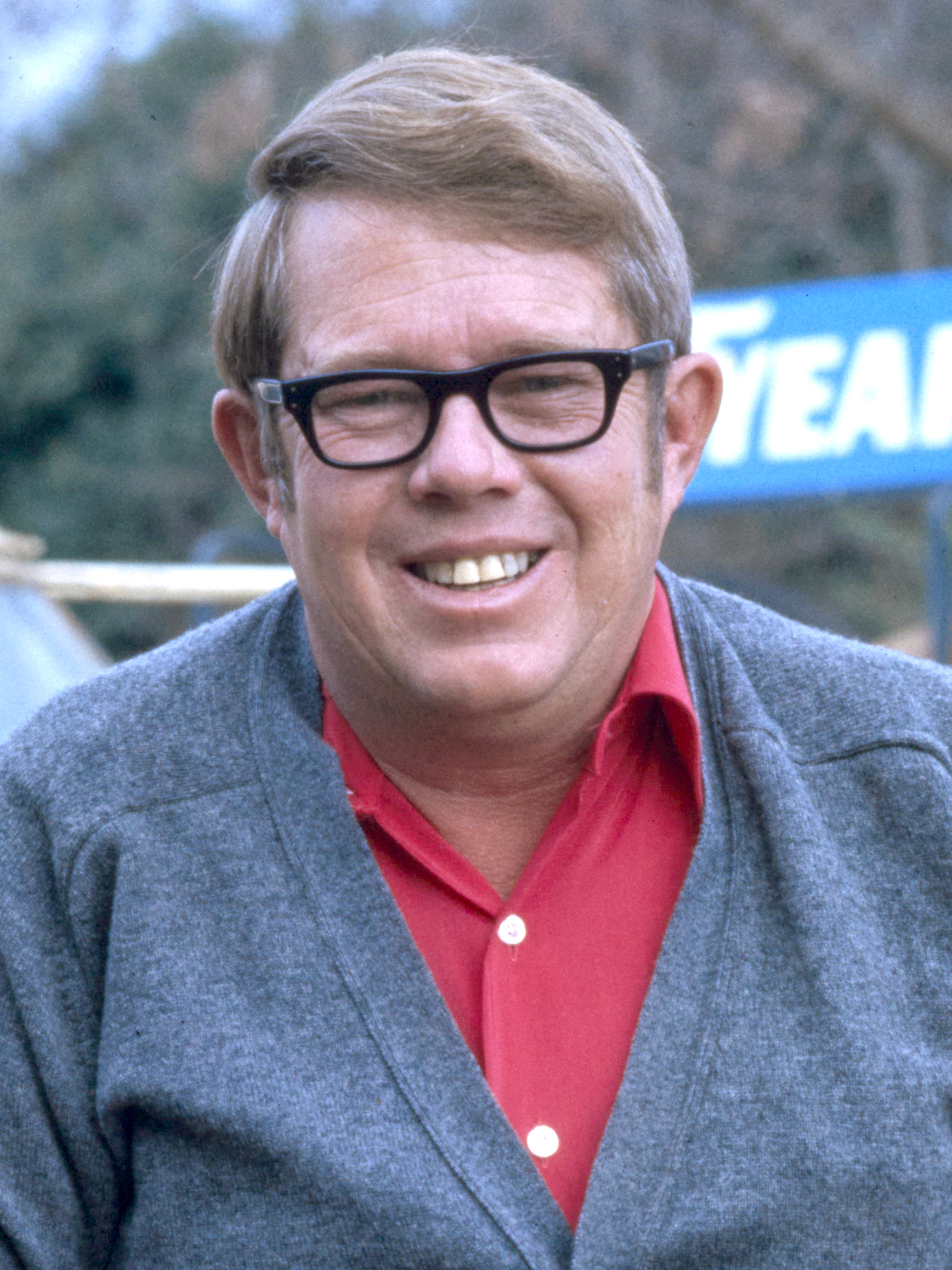
- Carter photographed between 1977 and 1981 by Bernard Gotfryd
- Born: William Alton Carter; March 29, 1937; Plains, Georgia, U.S.
- Died: September 25, 1988 (aged 51); Plains, Georgia, U.S.
- Education: Emory University
- Occupations: Farmer, businessman, brewer
- Spouse: Sybil Spires (m. 1955)
- Children: 6
- Parents: James Earl Carter Sr. (father); Lillian Gordy Carter (mother)
- Relatives: Jimmy Carter (brother); Gloria Carter Spann (sister); Ruth Carter Stapleton (sister)

William Alton Carter (March 29, 1937 – September 25, 1988) was an American farmer, businessman and brewer. The younger brother of U.S. President Jimmy Carter, he promoted Billy Beer and Peanut Lolita; and he was a candidate for mayor of Plains, Georgia.

== Early life ==
William Alton Carter was the fourth and youngest child of Lillian and James Earl Carter Sr. He attended Emory University, served in the United States Marine Corps, and later worked in the Carter family's peanut business.

== 1970s and later ==
In 1970, Billy Carter was managing partner and 15% owner of the Carter family's peanut business. By 1976, Billy had increased revenues to $5 million per year.

In 1972, Carter purchased a gas and service station in Plains. He owned and operated it for most of the decade. At its peak he sold 2,000 cases of beer a month and more than 40,000 gallons of gas. In 2009, the station became the Billy Carter Service Station Museum, via the University of Georgia.

Carter ran for mayor of Plains in 1976 but lost the election, 97 to 71 votes, to A.L. Blanton, an Albany airport air traffic controller.

In the 1970s, Billy Carter was the official spokesperson for Peanut Lolita liqueur.

In 1977, although a Pabst Blue Ribbon drinker, he endorsed Billy Beer, introduced by the Falls City Brewing Company, who wished to capitalize upon his colorful image as a beer-drinking Southern good ol' boy. Billy Carter's name was occasionally used as a gag answer for a Washington, D.C. trouble-maker on 1970s episodes of Match Game. He was known for his outlandish public behavior; he once urinated on an airport runway in full view of the press and dignitaries.

By 1979, he drank half a gallon of vodka and whiskey a day. In February 1979, Carter was admitted to seven weeks of rehabilitation at the Long Beach, California Navy Hospital alcohol treatment facility. He later became sober and reportedly extended support to other addicts in their own recovery.

In 1981, he was forced to sell his Plains properties to pay taxes and debts and moved to Haleyville, Alabama, where he worked in sales for Tidwell Industries. In 1985, he became Vice President of Scott Housing Systems.

== Relationship with Libya ==
In late 1978 and early 1979, Billy Carter visited Libya three times with a contingent from Georgia. He eventually registered as a foreign agent of the Libyan government and received a $220,000 loan, of which, The New York Times speculated, only $1,000 was repaid. However, Edwin P. Wilson claimed he had seen a telegram showing that Libya paid Billy Carter $2 million. This led to a Senate hearing on alleged influence peddling, which the press named Billygate. A Senate sub-committee was called To Investigate Activities of Individuals Representing Interests of Foreign Governments (Billy Carter—Libya Investigation).

"I am deeply concerned that Billy has received funds from Libya and that he may be under obligation to Libya. These facts will govern my relationship with Billy as long as I am president. Billy has had no influence on U.S. policy or actions concerning Libya in the past, and he will have no influence in the future."

— Jimmy Carter, August 4, 1980

A 1985 Wall Street Journal article suggested that a series of Billygate articles written by Michael Ledeen and published in The New Republic in October 1980 were intended to influence the outcome of that year's presidential election. According to the reporting, Francesco Pazienza, an officer of the Italian intelligence agency SISMI, alleged that Ledeen was handed Billygate information by the Italian Intelligence agency and he co-authored the articles with Arnaud de Borchgrave. Pazienza was later tried and convicted in absentia for using "extortion and fraud to obtain embarrassing facts about Billy Carter".

== Death ==
Carter was diagnosed with pancreatic cancer in the fall of 1987 and received treatment for the disease, which was unsuccessful. He died in Plains the following year at age 51, five years after his sister Ruth Carter Stapleton died from pancreatic cancer at age 54. A year and a half later, his older sister Gloria Carter Spann died at age 63 from pancreatic cancer. Their father James Earl Carter Sr. also died of the disease at age 58. Their mother Lillian Gordy Carter died from breast cancer at age 85. His older brother Jimmy Carter died at age 100 in 2024.

After Billy died, his wife Sybil opened a cafe.

== Bibliography ==
- Carter, William "Buddy" (1999) Billy Carter: A Journey Through the Shadows (ISBN 1-56352-553-4).
- Carter, Billy (1977). Rifkin, Jeremy; Howard, Ted (eds.). Redneck power : the wit and wisdom of Billy Carter. New York, New York: Bantam Books.

== See also ==
- List of scandals with "-gate" suffix
