= Nayana Ferguson =

American business woman

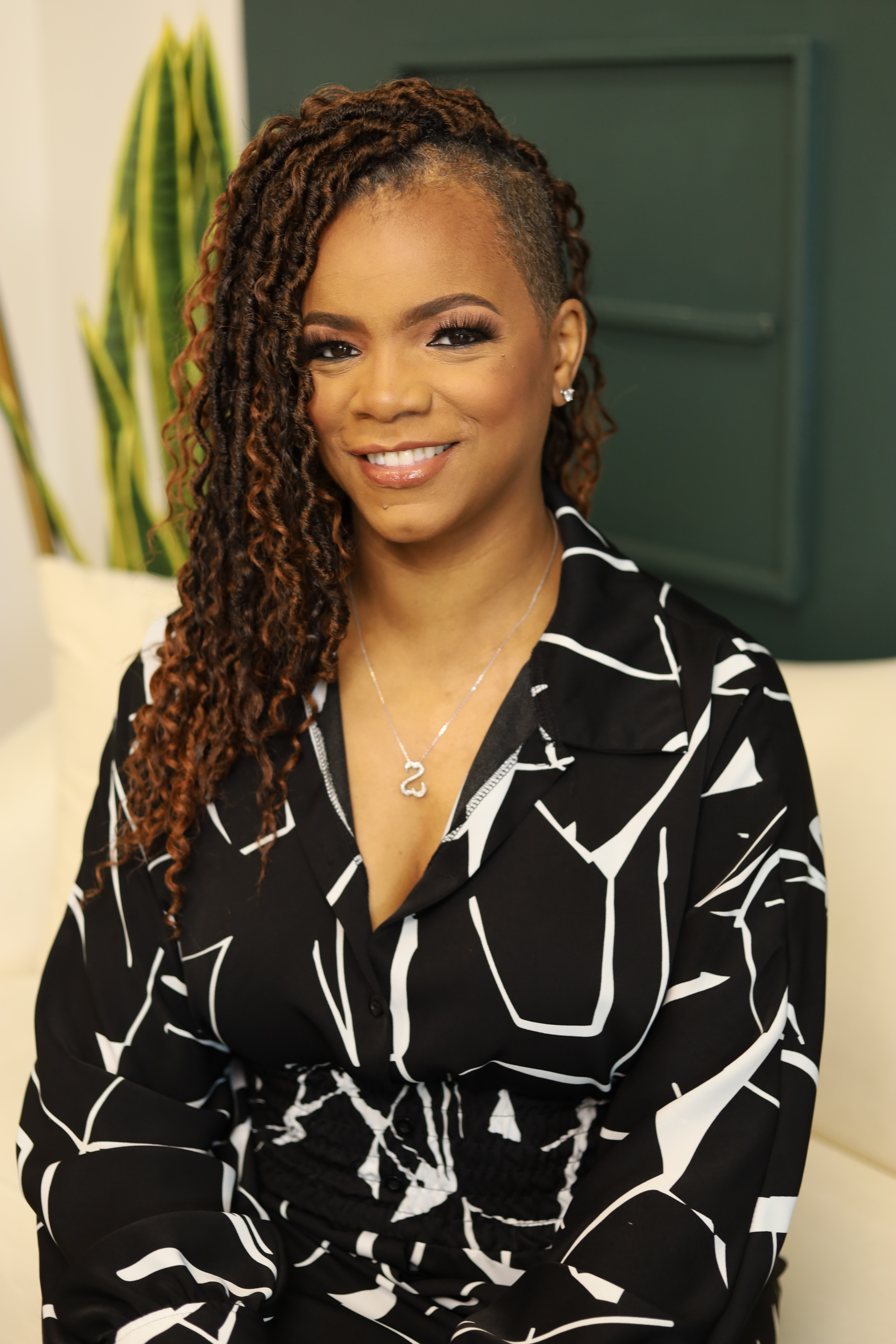

Nayana Doletta Ferguson is an African-American businesswoman. Co-founder and CEO of Anteel Tequila, she is the first Black woman to own and run a tequila company.

== Life ==
Ferguson was born and grew up in Detroit, Michigan. She graduated from Cass Technical High School. Ferguson later had a career in business before launching Anteel Tequila (previously known as Teeq Tequila) in August 2018 with her husband Don Ferguson in Detroit. The company's name was inspired by the Antillean Crested hummingbird, which Ferguson and her husband saw on their honeymoon in the Dominican Republic. The couple and company moved to Atlanta around 2022. Ferguson's Anteel Tequila products have received numerous industry awards, including SIP Awards, and the San Francisco World Spirits Competition.

Ferguson promoted her company as a featured guest on The Kelly Clarkson Show on February 17, 2022.

== Health ==
Ferguson was diagnosed with pancreatic cancer in 2005 and with breast cancer in 2012. She was involved with PanCan Detroit affiliate of volunteers which is connected with the Pancreatic Cancer Action Network.
