= Ruth Carter Stapleton =

Sister of Jimmy Carter

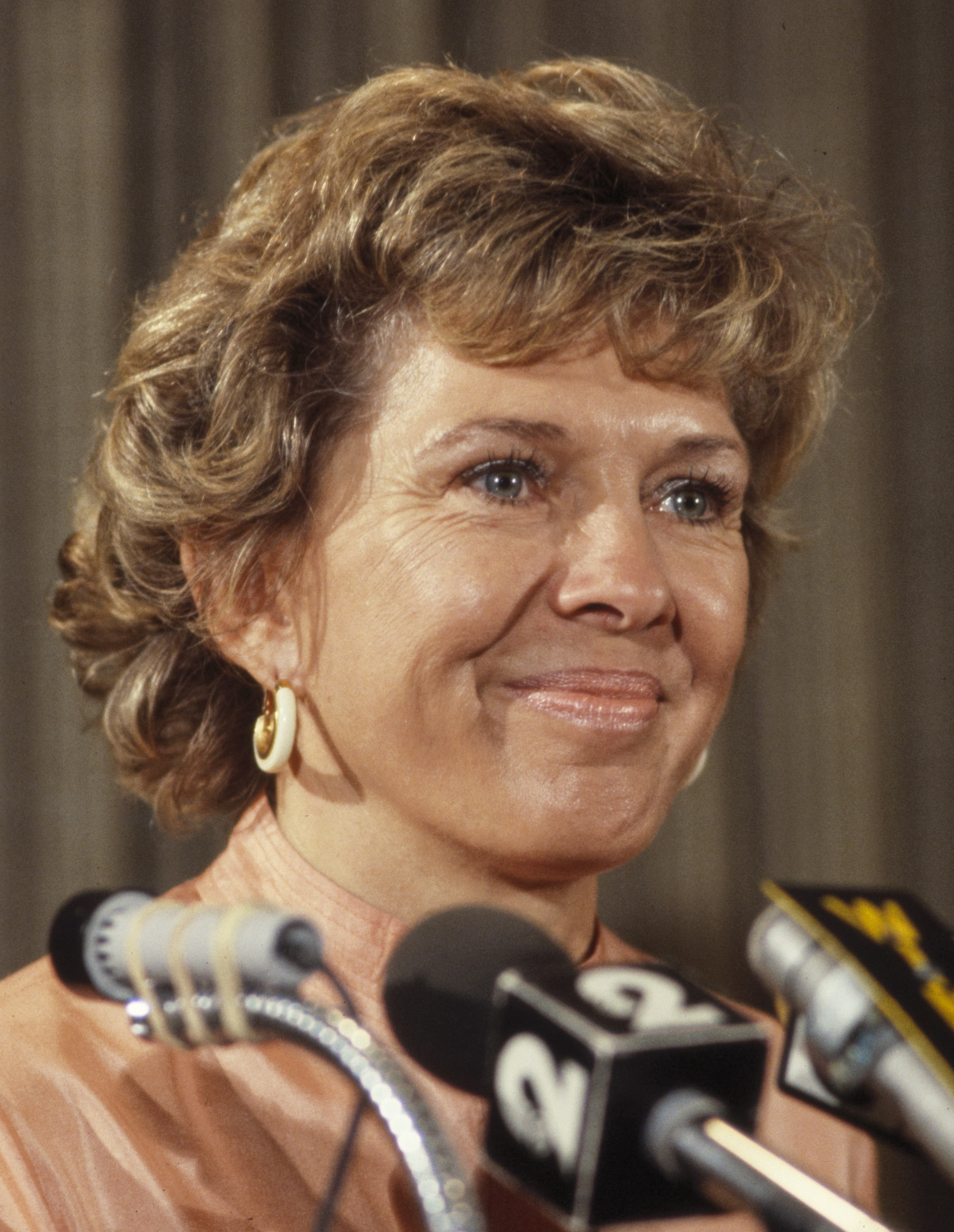
- Carter in 1978
- Born: Ruth Carter; August 7, 1929; Plains, Georgia, U.S.
- Died: September 26, 1983 (aged 54); Fayetteville, North Carolina, U.S.
- Education: Georgia State College for Women; Methodist University (BA); University of North Carolina, Chapel Hill (MA)
- Known for: Evangelism
- Spouse: Robert Stapleton (m. 1948)
- Children: 4
- Parents: James Earl Carter Sr. (father); Bessie Gordy (mother)
- Relatives: Jimmy Carter (brother); Gloria Carter Spann (sister); Billy Carter (brother); Jack Carter (nephew); Chip Carter (nephew); Donnel Carter (nephew); Amy Carter (niece)

Ruth Carter Stapleton (née Carter; August 7, 1929 – September 26, 1983) was an American Christian evangelist. She was the younger sister of United States President Jimmy Carter and Rosalynn Carter’s best friend.

== Early life and family ==
Ruth Carter Stapleton was born on August 7, 1929, in Plains, Georgia, the third of the four children in the family of James Earl Carter, Sr. and Lillian Gordy Carter.

Besides the former president, Stapleton had an older sister, Gloria (1926–1990), and a younger brother, Billy (1937–1988). All three of them died of pancreatic cancer, as did their father.

== Education, career, and family ==
Stapleton attended Georgia State College for Women, earned her bachelor's in English from Methodist University, and her master's in psychology from the University of North Carolina at Chapel Hill.

Stapleton married Robert Thome Stapleton (1925–2014), a veterinarian, in 1948 and they had four children: Gloria Lynn (born May 31, 1950), Sydney Scott (December 23, 1951 – December 13, 2019), Patricia Gordy (born May 29, 1954) and Robert Michael (born November 5, 1958). Stapleton suffered from chronic depression, and was involved in a car accident that nearly killed her during the time immediately following her children's births. She said she was later cured of depression at a "Christ-centered camp".

In 1977, she became friends with pornographer Larry Flynt and managed to briefly convert him to Christianity. She was portrayed during this portion of Flynt's life by Donna Hanover in the film The People vs. Larry Flynt.

Stapleton was also known for her involvement in the faith-healing ministry, especially in healing memories. Her books The Gift of Inner Healing, The Experience of Inner Healing, and In His Footsteps: The Healing Ministry of Jesus, Then and Now, illustrate her beliefs about inner healing, which involved healing memories, in which one would go over one's memories and bring Jesus into the memory to help one forgive or be comforted as required by Jesus.

== Death ==
Stapleton died of pancreatic cancer on September 26, 1983, aged 54. One month after her death, her mother died of breast cancer, aged 85.

== Bibliography ==
- Stapleton, Ruth Carter (1968). Power Through Release. Macalester Park Pub. Co.
- Stapleton, Ruth Carter (1973). In His Footsteps. Harper & Row. ISBN 0-06-067516-0.
- Stapleton, Ruth Carter (1976). The Gift of Inner Healing. Word Books. ISBN 0-8499-0082-4.
- Stapleton, Ruth Carter (1978). Brother Billy. Harper & Row. ISBN 0-06-014063-1.
- Stapleton, Ruth Carter (1979). The Experience of Inner Healing. Bantam Books. ISBN 978-0-553-12047-9.
- Stapleton, Ruth Carter (1979). In His Footsteps : The Healing Ministry of Jesus, Then and Now. Harper and Row. ISBN 978-0-06-067516-5.
