= Brown Bomber (cocktail) =

- Type: Cocktail
- Ingredients: 1/2 oz peanut liqueur; 1/2 oz white creme de cacao; 2 oz light cream
- Standard drinkware: Old fashioned glass
- Standard garnish: none
- Served: Straight up: chilled, without ice
- Preparation: Shake all ingredients with ice, strain into a cocktail glass, and serve.

The Brown Bomber is a vintage American cocktail.

It is one of only a few cocktails to feature peanut liqueur, which is made by blending ground peanuts with a spirit, often rum.

The origin of the drink is unclear. It may have been created in honor of Joe Louis, the African-American boxer and World Heavyweight Champion from 1937 to 1949, who was nicknamed "The Brown Bomber."

== See also ==
- List of cocktails
