= Plains, Georgia =

City in the United States

Plains
- City
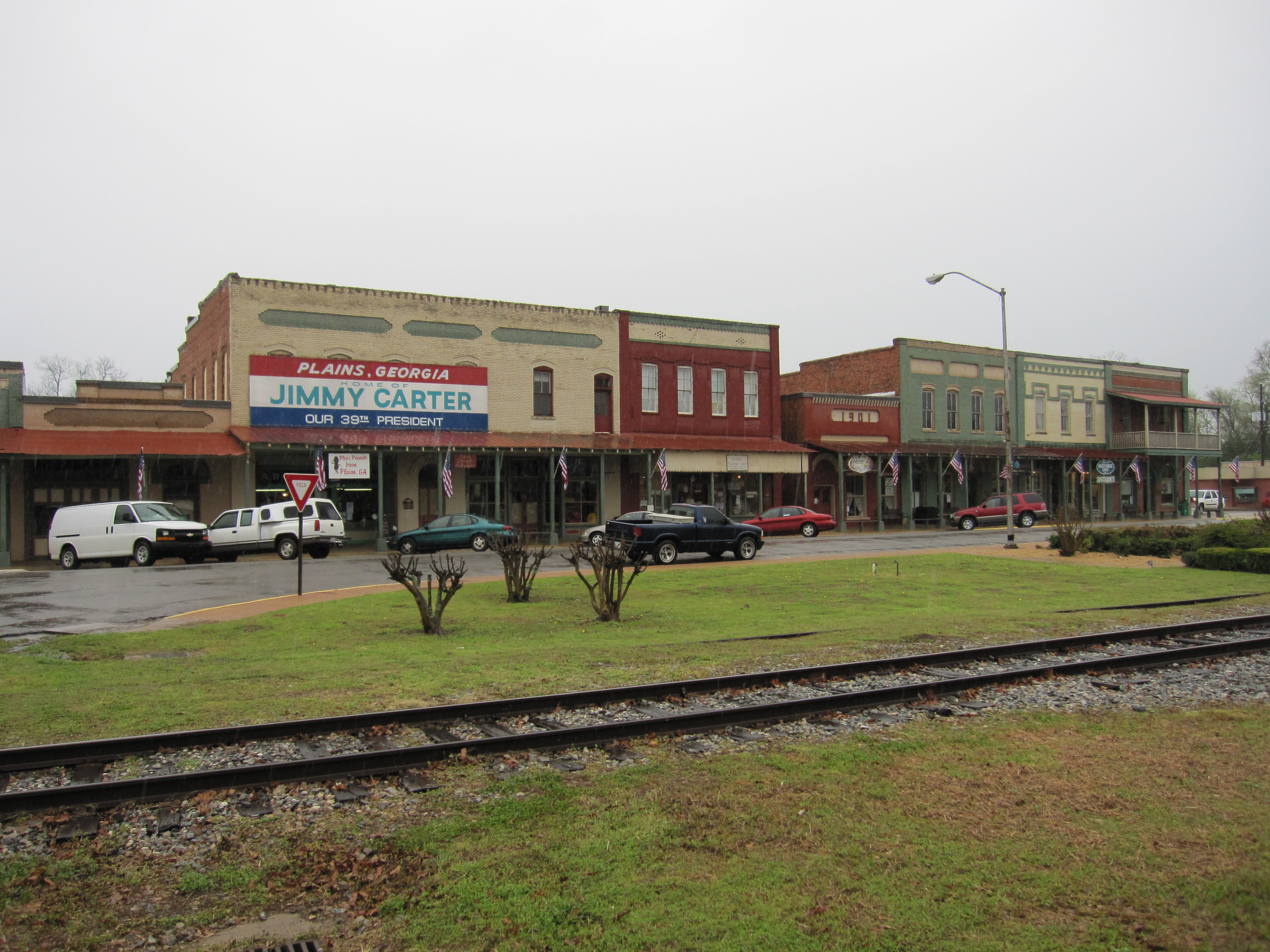
- Plains downtown storefronts (2011)

- Seal
- Motto: "Home of the 39th President"
- Location within Sumter County and Georgia

- Location of Plains in Georgia
- Coordinates: 32°2′1″N 84°23′36″W
- Country: United States
- State: Georgia
- County: Sumter
- Founded: 1885; 141 years ago

Government
  - Mayor: Joseph Recker Jr.

Area
  - Total: 0.81 sq mi (2.11 km^{2})
  - Land: 0.81 sq mi (2.11 km^{2})
  - Water: 0 sq mi (0.00 km^{2})
- Elevation: 499 ft (152 m)

Population (2020)
  - Total: 573
  - Density: 703/sq mi (272/km^{2})
- Time zone: UTC−5 (EST)
  - Summer (DST): UTC−4 (EDT)
- ZIP Code: 31780
- Area code: 229
- FIPS code: 13-61628
- GNIS ID: 356474
- Website: plainsgeorgia.gov

Plains is a city in Sumter County, Georgia, United States. As of the 2020 census, the population of the city was 573. It is well-known as the home and final resting place of Jimmy Carter and his wife Rosalynn, who were the 39th president and first lady of the United States from 1977 to 1981.

== History ==
Originally inhabited by the Muscogee people, three small settlements existed close to what would become Plains by the 1840s: Lebanon, Magnolia Springs, and Plains of Dura. In 1885, a significant turning point occurred when a major east–west railroad extended into the area and led to the three settlements being consolidated into one. As railway access expanded into the region in response to increased cotton farming, these settlements coalesced closer to the new railway location. As businesses rapidly developed, local businessmen successfully petitioned the Georgia State Legislature to shorten "Plains of Dura" to simply "Plains." The city was incorporated in 1896.

Plains continued to experience growth fueled by cotton cultivation into the early 20th century. A substantial school and the pioneering Wise Sanitarium were both built in the 1920s. Despite branching into peanut cultivation, the city’s prosperity mostly eroded during the Great Depression and by 1951 the city’s once vital train depot after years of declining demand and profitability permanently ceased passenger operations.

The city remained a small and quiet one until the unexpected political ascent of Plains native Jimmy Carter. In 1971, he became Georgia's governor. In 1976, although mostly unknown outside of Georgia, he ran as a dark horse candidate for President of the United States, using the former train depot as his campaign headquarters. After unexpectedly winning that election over incumbent President Gerald Ford, Carter served one term as president from 1977 to 1981. He returned to Plains with his wife and family after losing the 1980 presidential election in a landslide to Republican Party nominee Ronald Reagan. During the 1976 presidential election and for many years afterwards, the city saw a giant influx in tourism due to Carter's name, with nearly 10,000 people (around 18 times the population of Plains) pouring into the community daily.

== Geography ==
According to the United States Census Bureau, the city has a total area of 0.8 square miles (2.1 km^{2}), all land. The city's boundary is in the shape of a circle. It is located in west-south-western Georgia, 120 miles (190 km) due south of Atlanta.

=== Climate ===
This area climate is characterized by hot, humid summers and generally mild to cool winters. According to the Köppen Climate Classification system, Plains has a humid subtropical climate, abbreviated "Cfa" on climate maps.

Climate data for Plains, Georgia
Month	Jan	Feb	Mar	Apr	May	Jun	Jul	Aug	Sep	Oct	Nov	Dec	Year
Mean daily maximum °F (°C)	57 (14)	61 (16)	68 (20)	77 (25)	84 (29)	89 (32)	91 (33)	90 (32)	86 (30)	78 (26)	69 (21)	60 (16)	76 (24)
Mean daily minimum °F (°C)	35 (2)	37 (3)	44 (7)	51 (11)	60 (16)	67 (19)	69 (21)	69 (21)	64 (18)	53 (12)	44 (7)	37 (3)	52 (11)
Average precipitation inches (mm)	4.9 (120)	4.6 (120)	5.2 (130)	3.5 (89)	3.3 (84)	4.7 (120)	5.2 (130)	4.5 (110)	3.5 (89)	2.4 (61)	3.3 (84)	4.2 (110)	49.4 (1,250)
Source: Weatherbase

== Demographics ==
Historical population
Census	Pop.	Note	%±
1870	374		—
1880	459		22.7%
1890	510		11.1%
1900	290		−43.1%
1910	407		40.3%
1920	479		17.7%
1930	406		−15.2%
1940	364		−10.3%
1950	359		−1.4%
1960	273		−24.0%
1970	236		−13.6%
1980	231		−2.1%
1990	286		23.8%
2000	637		122.7%
2010	776		21.8%
2020	573		−26.2%
U.S. Decennial Census; 1850-1870 1870-1880; 1890-1910 1920-1930; 1940 1950 1960; 1970 1980 1990; 2000 2010 2020

Plains is part of the Americus Micropolitan Statistical Area.

=== Racial and ethnic composition ===
Plains city, Georgia – Racial and ethnic composition Note: the US Census treats Hispanic/Latino as an ethnic category. This table excludes Latinos from the racial categories and assigns them to a separate category. Hispanics/Latinos may be of any race.
Race / Ethnicity (NH = Non-Hispanic)	Pop 2000	Pop 2010	Pop 2020	% 2000	% 2010	% 2020
White alone (NH)	238	392	239	37.36%	50.52%	41.71%
Black or African American alone (NH)	379	331	307	59.50%	42.65%	53.58%
Native American or Alaska Native alone (NH)	0	0	1	0.00%	0.00%	0.17%
Asian alone (NH)	0	0	3	0.00%	0.00%	0.52%
Native Hawaiian or Pacific Islander alone (NH)	0	0	0	0.00%	0.00%	0.00%
Other race alone (NH)	0	0	0	0.00%	0.00%	0.00%
Mixed race or Multiracial (NH)	2	2	5	0.31%	0.26%	0.87%
Hispanic or Latino (any race)	18	51	18	2.83%	6.57%	3.14%
Total	637	776	573	100.00%	100.00%	100.00%

=== 2000 census ===
As of the 2000 census, there were 637 people, 215 households, and 136 families residing in the city. The population density was 780.0 inhabitants per square mile (301.2/km^{2}). There were 244 housing units at an average density of 298.8 per square mile (115.4/km^{2}). The racial makeup of the city was 38.62% White, 59.81% African American, 1.26% from other races, and 0.31% from two or more races. Hispanic or Latino of any race were 2.83% of the population. There were 215 households, out of which 25.6% had children under the age of 18 living with them, 36.7% were married couples living together, 24.2% had a female householder with no husband present, and 36.3% were non-families. 34.9% of all households were made up of individuals, and 19.5% had someone living alone who was 65 years of age or older. The average household size was 2.50 and the average family size was 3.31.

In the city, the population was spread out, with 24.6% under the age of 18, 8.5% from 18 to 24, 16.5% from 25 to 44, 20.3% from 45 to 64, and 30.1% who were 65 years of age or older. The median age was 45 years. For every 100 females, there were 69.0 males. For every 100 females age 18 and over, there were 58.9 males.

The median income for a household in the city was $26,719, and the median income for a family was $29,375. Males had a median income of $24,375 versus $16,406 for females. The per capita income for the city was $11,602. About 22.2% of families and 25.6% of the population were below the poverty line, including 47.2% of those under age 18 and 17.3% of those age 65 or over.

== Education ==
The city is located in the Sumter County School District.

== Points of interest ==
Many of the town's attractions are centered around Jimmy Carter, including the Jimmy Carter National Historical Park. Carter's high school, birthplace, campaign headquarters, former site of family business, his brother Billy's service station, and his burial site are all within a close vicinity of one another in the center of town. The iconic Smiling Peanut Statue, a gift to Carter from supporters in Evansville, Indiana, lies on the outskirts of town. His boyhood home is in the nearby unincorporated community of Archery.

Andersonville National Historic Site and the National Prisoner of War Museum are located in the vicinity of Plains. Georgia Southwestern State University is located in the nearby town of Americus.

== Notable residents ==
President Jimmy Carter was born in Plains at the Wise Sanitarium, now renamed the Lillian G. Carter Nursing Center in honor of his mother. His wife Rosalynn and their daughter and youngest child Amy were also born in Plains, as were his younger brother Billy, younger sister Gloria, youngest sister Ruth, and cousin Hugh. When he left office in 1981, Carter and his wife returned to live in the home in Plains they have occupied since 1961, where they both died. Rosalynn Carter died on November 19, 2023, and President Carter died on December 29, 2024. Both are interred on the grounds of their home, which is part of the Jimmy Carter National Historic Park.

== Gallery ==
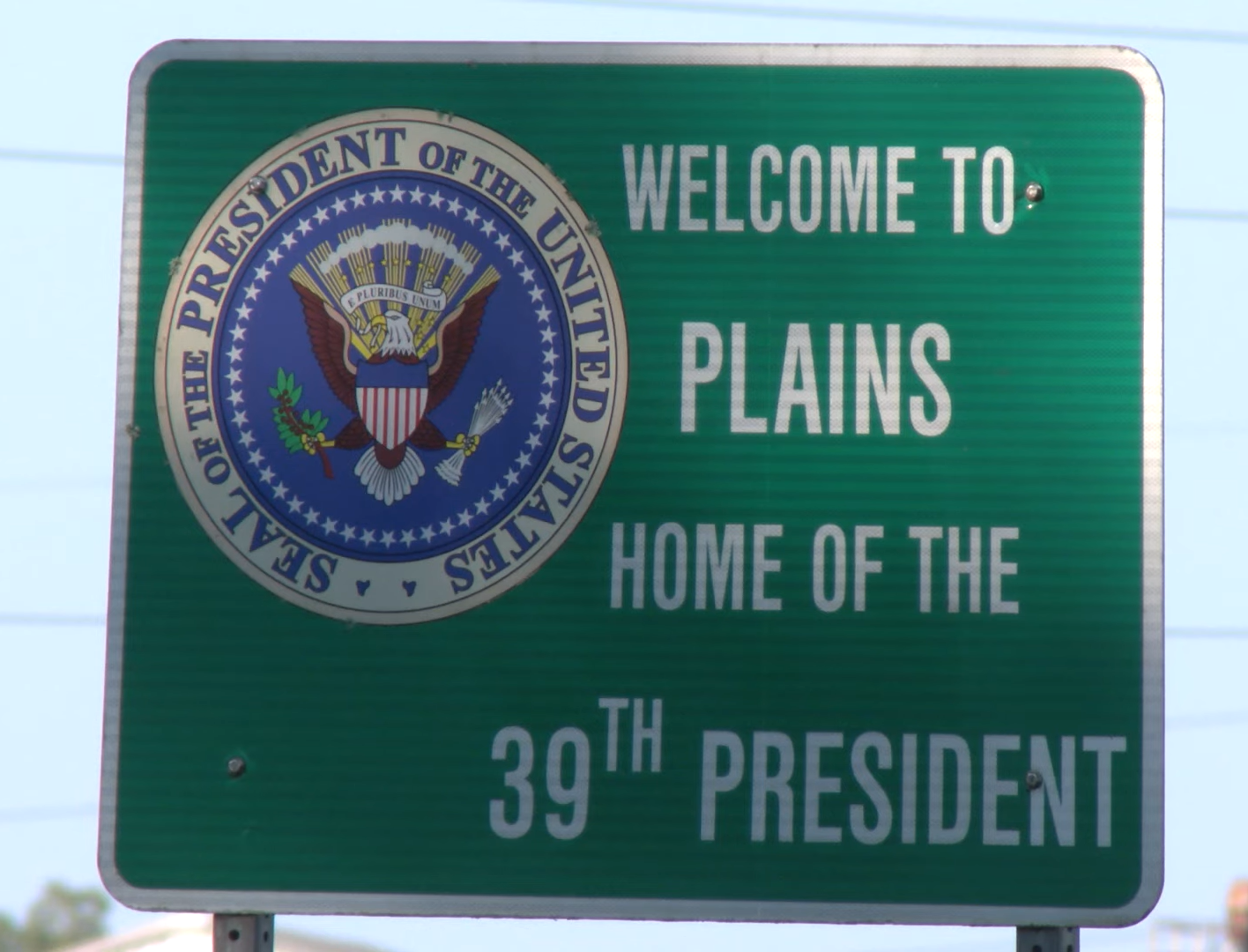
The Plains welcome sign, featuring the Seal of the president of the United States

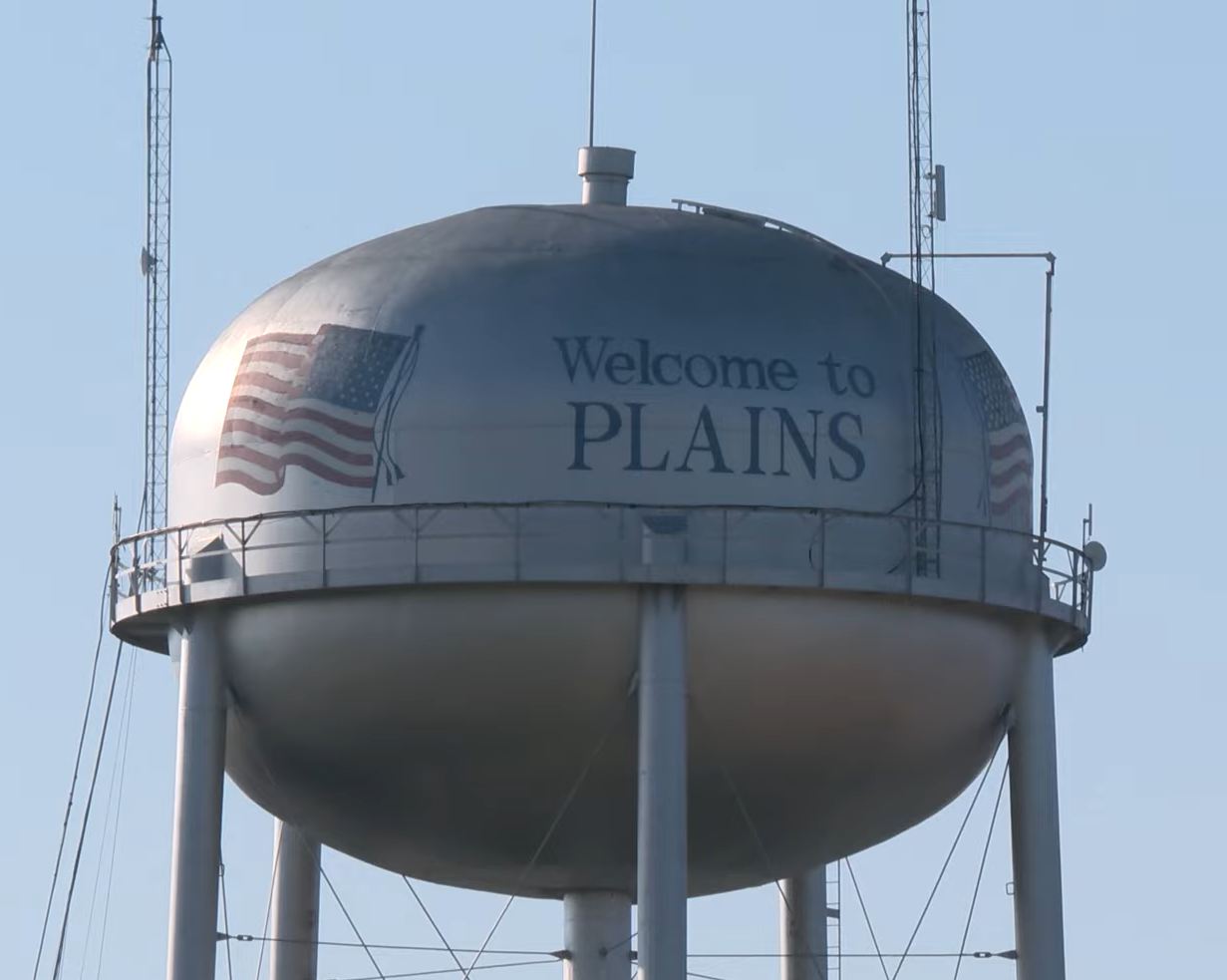
The Plains water tower

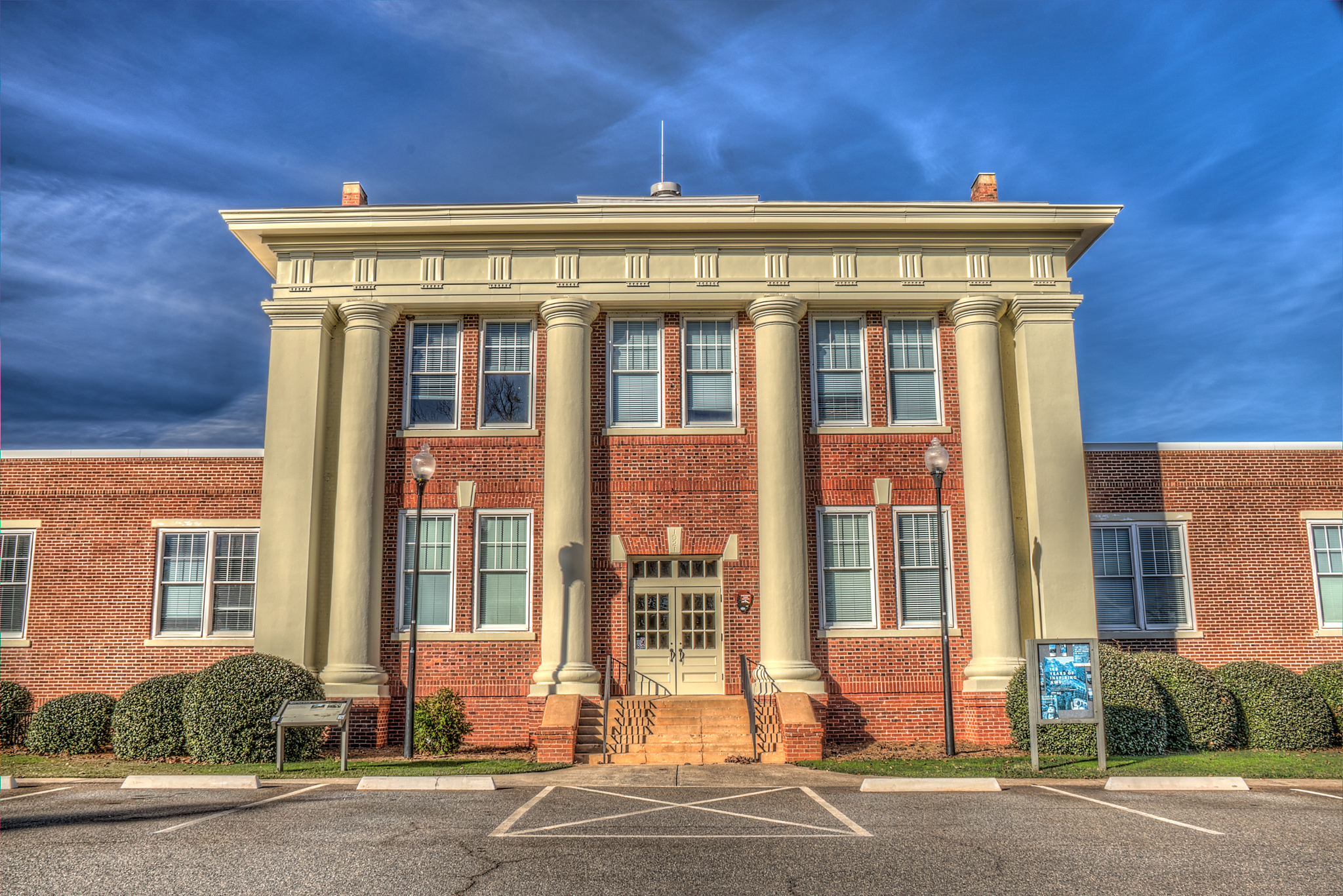
Carter's High School which operated from 1921 until it permanently closed in 1979, now a visitor center and museum

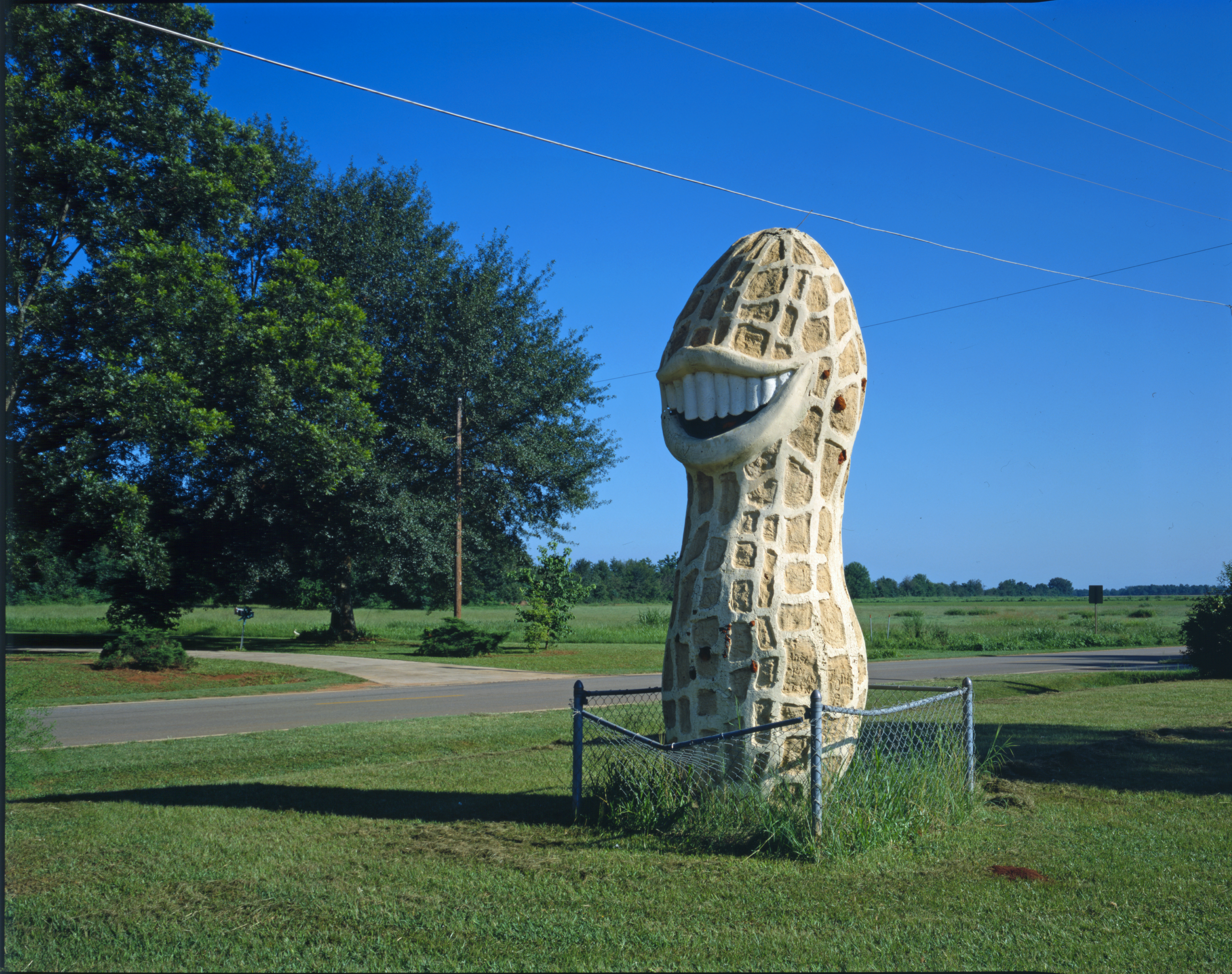
Jimmy Carter Peanut Statue

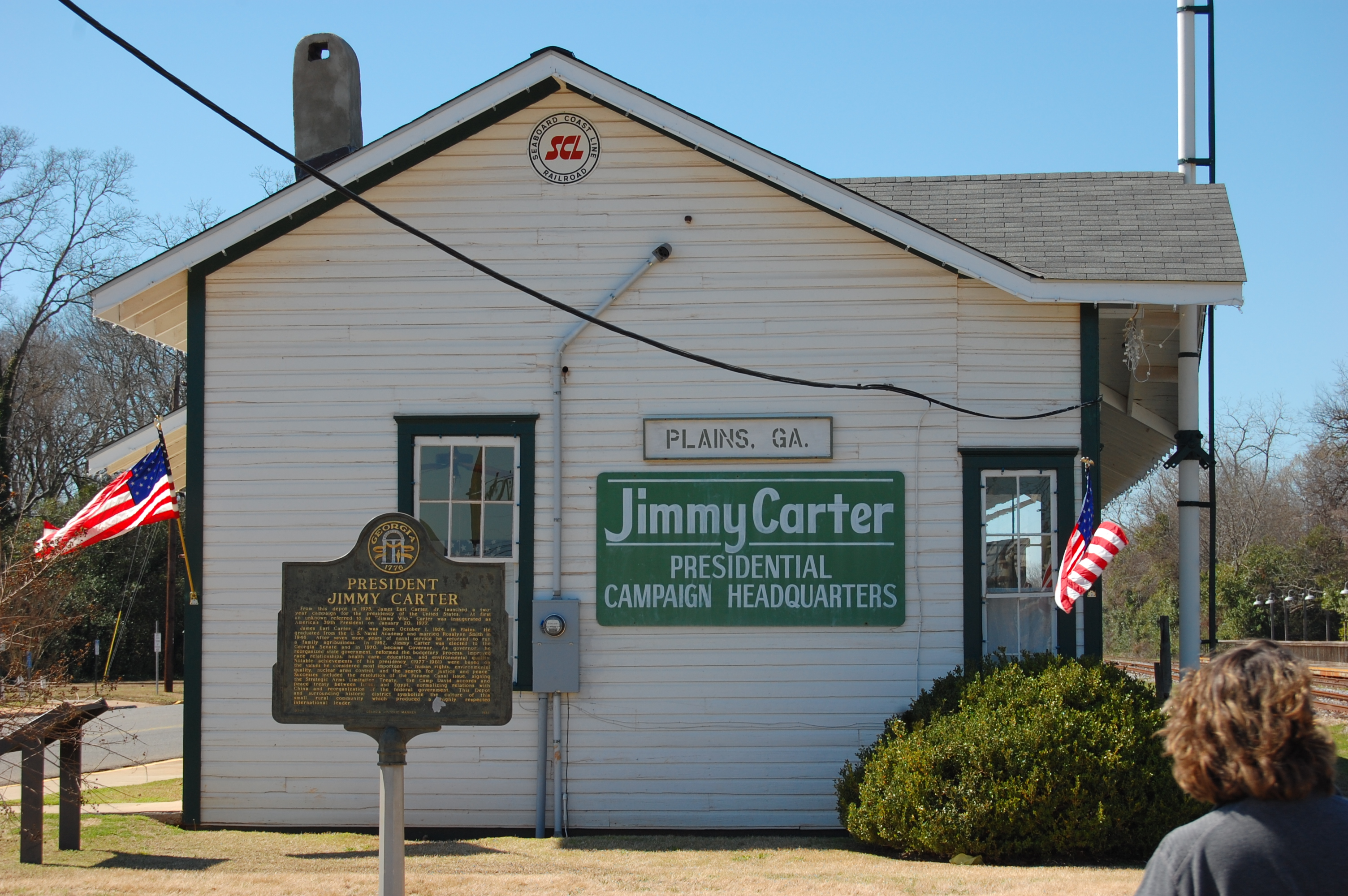
Carter campaign headquarters and former train depot (2008)

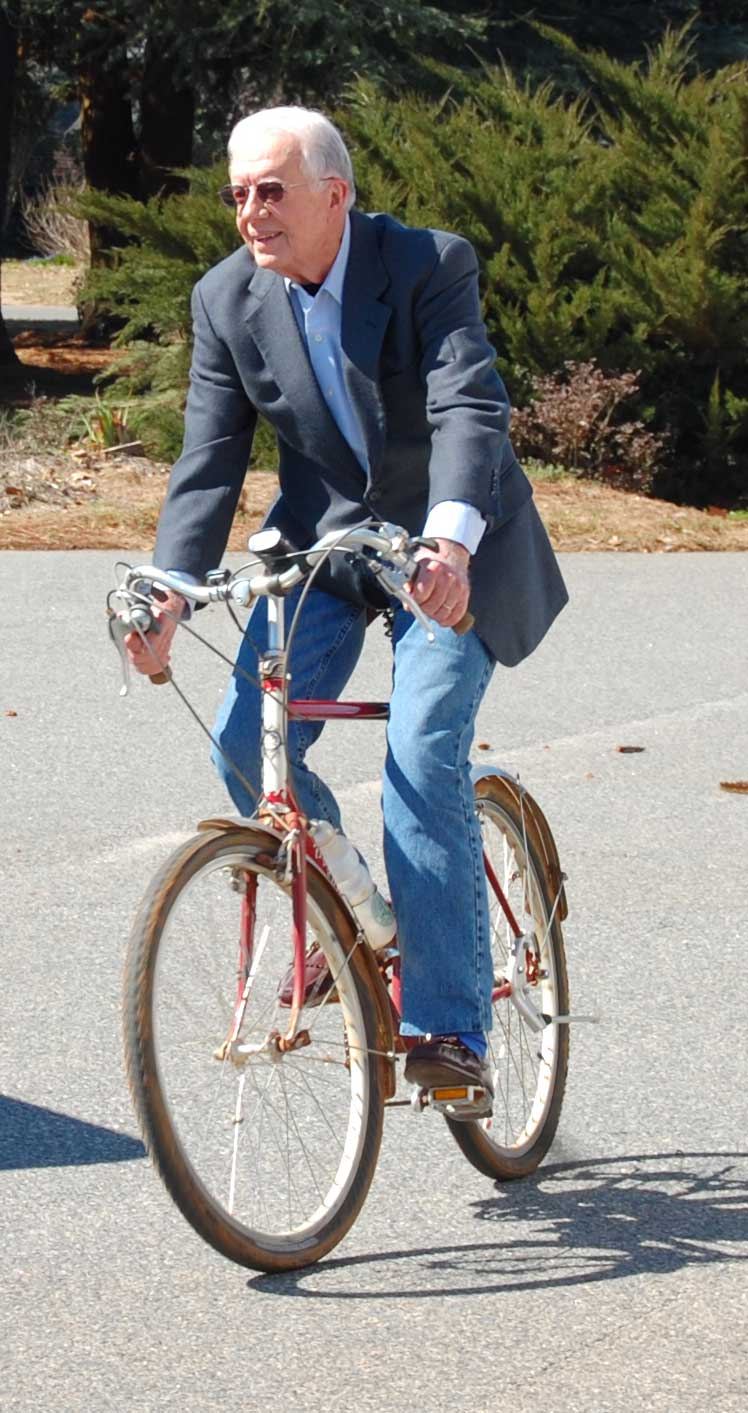
Jimmy Carter cycling in Plains (2008)

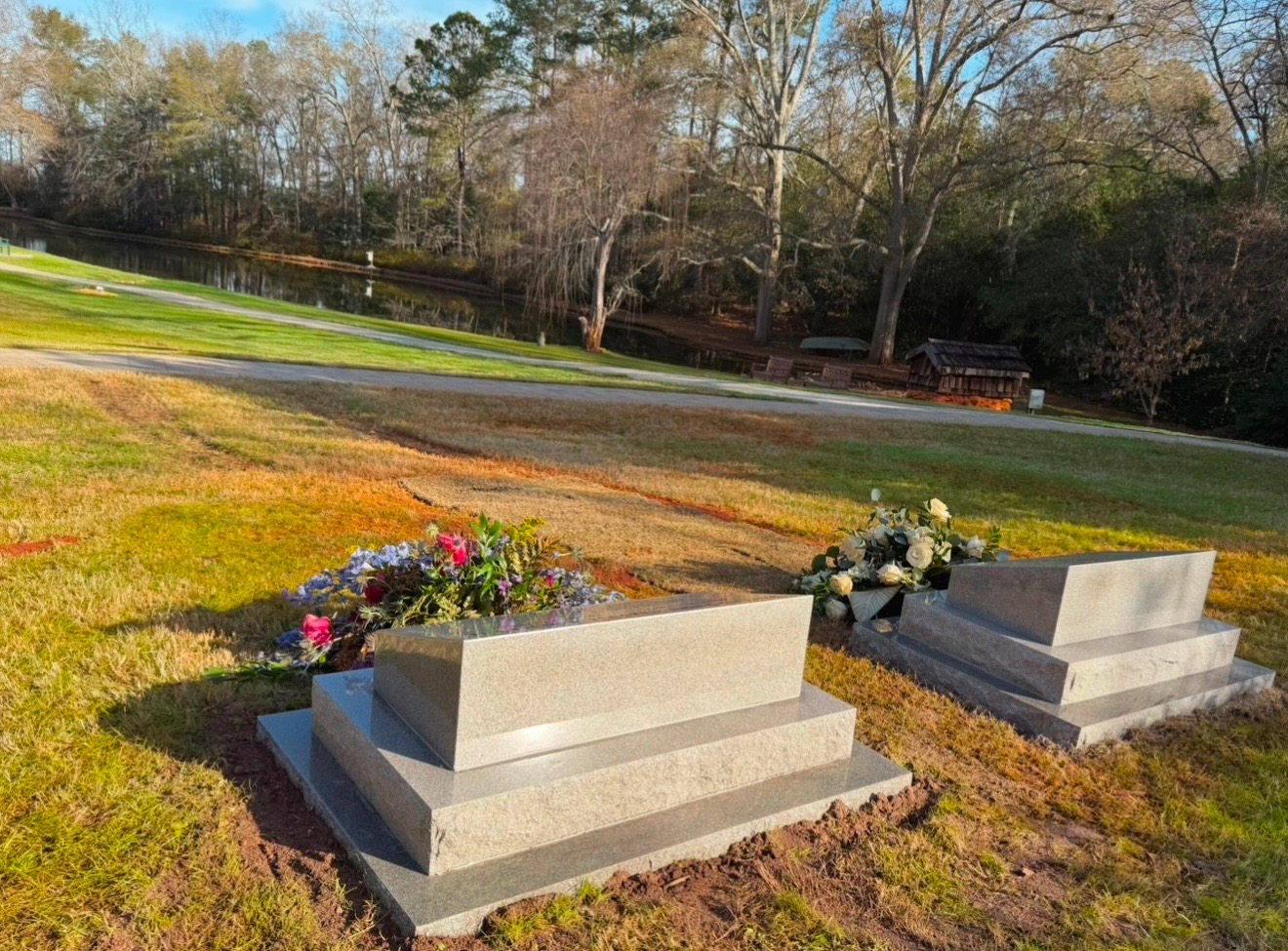
Burial site of Jimmy & Rosalynn Carter
