= List of presidents of the United States by home state =

These lists give the states of birth and of primary affiliation for each president of the United States.

== Birthplaces ==
Twenty-one states have the distinction of being the birthplace of a president.

One president's birth state is in dispute; North and South Carolina (British colonies at the time) both lay claim to Andrew Jackson, who was born in 1767 in the Waxhaw region along their common border. Jackson himself considered South Carolina his birth state.

Born on December 5, 1782, Martin Van Buren was the first president born an American citizen (and not a British subject).

The term Virginia dynasty is sometimes used to describe the fact that four of the first five U.S. presidents were from Virginia.

The number of presidents per state in which they were born, counting Jackson as being from South Carolina, are:

- One: Arkansas, California, Connecticut, Georgia, Hawaii, Illinois, Iowa, Kentucky, Missouri, Nebraska, New Hampshire, New Jersey, and South Carolina
- Two: North Carolina, Pennsylvania, Texas, and Vermont
- Four: Massachusetts
- Five: New York
- Seven: Ohio
- Eight: Virginia

| Date of birth | President | Birthplace | Nearest town | State^{†} of birth | In office |
|---|---|---|---|---|---|
| February 22, 1732 | George Washington | Wakefield Plantation | Popes Creek | Virginia^{†} | (1st) April 30, 1789 – March 4, 1797 |
| October 30, 1735 | John Adams | 133 Franklin Street | Quincy | Massachusetts^{†} | (2nd) March 4, 1797 – March 4, 1801 |
| April 13, 1743* | Thomas Jefferson | Shadwell Plantation | Shadwell | Virginia^{†} | (3rd) March 4, 1801 – March 4, 1809 |
| March 16, 1751 | James Madison | Belle Grove Plantation | Port Conway | Virginia^{†} | (4th) March 4, 1809 – March 4, 1817 |
| April 28, 1758 | James Monroe | Monroe Family Home | Monroe Hall | Virginia^{†} | (5th) March 4, 1817 – March 4, 1825 |
| March 15, 1767 | Andrew Jackson | Uncertain | Waxhaws Region | South Carolina^{†} | (7th) March 4, 1829 – March 4, 1837 |
| July 11, 1767 | John Quincy Adams | 141 Franklin Street | Quincy | Massachusetts^{†} | (6th) March 4, 1825 – March 4, 1829 |
| February 9, 1773 | William Henry Harrison | Berkeley Plantation | Charles City County | Virginia^{†} | (9th) March 4, 1841 – April 4, 1841 |
| December 5, 1782 | Martin Van Buren | Abraham Van Buren Tavern | Kinderhook | New York | (8th) March 4, 1837 – March 4, 1841 |
| November 24, 1784 | Zachary Taylor | Uncertain | Barboursville | Virginia | (12th) March 4, 1849 – July 9, 1850 |
| March 29, 1790 | John Tyler | Greenway Plantation | Charles City County | Virginia | (10th) April 4, 1841 – March 4, 1845 |
| April 23, 1791 | James Buchanan | Stony Batter | Cove Gap | Pennsylvania | (15th) March 4, 1857 – March 4, 1861 |
| November 2, 1795 | James K. Polk | Samuel Polk Cabin | Pineville | North Carolina | (11th) March 4, 1845 – March 4, 1849 |
| January 7, 1800 | Millard Fillmore | Nathaniel Fillmore Cabin | Summerhill | New York | (13th) July 9, 1850 – March 4, 1853 |
| November 23, 1804 | Franklin Pierce | Benjamin Pierce Homestead | Hillsborough | New Hampshire | (14th) March 4, 1853 – March 4, 1857 |
| December 29, 1808 | Andrew Johnson | Jacob Johnson House | Raleigh | North Carolina | (17th) April 15, 1865 – March 4, 1869 |
| February 12, 1809 | Abraham Lincoln | Sinking Spring Farm | Hodgenville | Kentucky | (16th) March 4, 1861 – April 15, 1865 |
| April 27, 1822 | Ulysses S. Grant | Jesse Root Grant House | Point Pleasant | Ohio | (18th) March 4, 1869 – March 4, 1877 |
| October 4, 1822 | Rutherford B. Hayes | 17 East William Street | Delaware | Ohio | (19th) March 4, 1877 – March 4, 1881 |
| October 5, 1829 | Chester A. Arthur | Rev. William Arthur House | Fairfield | Vermont | (21st) September 19, 1881 – March 4, 1885 |
| November 19, 1831 | James A. Garfield | Abram Garfield Cabin | Moreland Hills | Ohio | (20th) March 4, 1881 – September 19, 1881 |
| August 20, 1833 | Benjamin Harrison | Point Farm | North Bend | Ohio | (23rd) March 4, 1889 – March 4, 1893 |
| March 18, 1837 | Grover Cleveland | Caldwell Presbyterian Church Manse | Caldwell | New Jersey | (22nd) March 4, 1885 – March 4, 1889 (24th) March 4, 1893 – March 4, 1897 |
| January 29, 1843 | William McKinley | 40 North Main Street | Niles | Ohio | (25th) March 4, 1897 – September 14, 1901 |
| December 28, 1856 | Woodrow Wilson | Staunton First Presbyterian Church Manse | Staunton | Virginia | (28th) March 4, 1913 – March 4, 1921 |
| September 15, 1857 | William Howard Taft | 60 Auburn Street | Cincinnati | Ohio | (27th) March 4, 1909 – March 4, 1913 |
| October 27, 1858 | Theodore Roosevelt | 28 East 20th Street | New York City | New York | (26th) September 14, 1901 – March 4, 1909 |
| November 2, 1865 | Warren G. Harding | George Tryon Harding Farm | Blooming Grove | Ohio | (29th) March 4, 1921 – August 2, 1923 |
| July 4, 1872 | Calvin Coolidge | Coolidge Homestead | Plymouth | Vermont | (30th) August 2, 1923 – March 4, 1929 |
| August 10, 1874 | Herbert Hoover | Jesse Clark Hoover Cottage | West Branch | Iowa | (31st) March 4, 1929 – March 4, 1933 |
| January 30, 1882 | Franklin D. Roosevelt | Springwood | Hyde Park | New York | (32nd) March 4, 1933 – April 12, 1945 |
| May 8, 1884 | Harry S. Truman | Simon Blethroad House | Lamar | Missouri | (33rd) April 12, 1945 – January 20, 1953 |
| October 14, 1890 | Dwight D. Eisenhower | 609 South Lamar Avenue | Denison | Texas | (34th) January 20, 1953 – January 20, 1961 |
| August 27, 1908 | Lyndon B. Johnson | Sam Ealy Johnson Jr. House | Stonewall | Texas | (36th) November 22, 1963 – January 20, 1969 |
| February 6, 1911 | Ronald Reagan | Graham Building | Tampico | Illinois | (40th) January 20, 1981 – January 20, 1989 |
| January 9, 1913 | Richard Nixon | 18001 Yorba Linda Boulevard | Yorba Linda | California | (37th) January 20, 1969 – August 9, 1974 |
| July 14, 1913 | Gerald Ford | 3202 Woolworth Avenue | Omaha | Nebraska | (38th) August 9, 1974 – January 20, 1977 |
| May 29, 1917 | John F. Kennedy | 83 Beals Street | Brookline | Massachusetts | (35th) January 20, 1961 – November 22, 1963 |
| June 12, 1924 | George H. W. Bush | 173 Adams Street | Milton | Massachusetts | (41st) January 20, 1989 – January 20, 1993 |
| October 1, 1924 | Jimmy Carter | Wise Sanitarium | Plains | Georgia | (39th) January 20, 1977 – January 20, 1981 |
| November 20, 1942 | Joe Biden | St. Mary's Hospital, 930 Hickory Street | Scranton | Pennsylvania | (46th) January 20, 2021 – January 20, 2025 |
| June 14, 1946 | Donald Trump | Jamaica Hospital | Queens | New York | (45th) January 20, 2017 – January 20, 2021 (47th) January 20, 2025 – Present |
| July 6, 1946 | George W. Bush | Grace–New Haven Hospital | New Haven | Connecticut | (43rd) January 20, 2001 – January 20, 2009 |
| August 19, 1946 | Bill Clinton | Julia Chester Hospital, 1001 South Main Street | Hope | Arkansas | (42nd) January 20, 1993 – January 20, 2001 |
| August 4, 1961 | Barack Obama | Kapiʻolani Maternity and Gynecological Hospital | Honolulu | Hawaii | (44th) January 20, 2009 – January 20, 2017 |
^{*}Gregorian date; Julian date is April 2, 1743
^{†}Colony, pre–1776, rather than state.

== Presidential birthplace and early childhood historic sites ==
The birthplaces and early childhood residences of many U.S. presidents have been preserved or replicated. In instances where a physical structure is absent, a monument or roadside marker has been erected to denote the site's historic significance. All sites in the table below are listed in the National Register of Historic Places.

A dramatic shift in childbirth from home to hospital occurred in the United States in the early 20th century (mid–1920s to 1940). Reflective of this trend, Jimmy Carter and all presidents born during and after World War II (Bill Clinton and every president since) have been born in a hospital, not a private residence. This sortable table is ordered by the presidents' birthdates.

| President | Image | Historic site |
|---|---|---|
| George Washington | | George Washington Birthplace National Monument, Colonial Beach, Virginia |
| John Adams | | John Adams Birthplace, Quincy, Massachusetts |
| James Madison | | Belle Grove Plantation, Port Conway, Virginia |
| James Monroe | | James Monroe Birthplace Park & Museum, Colonial Beach, Virginia |
| John Quincy Adams | | John Quincy Adams Birthplace, Quincy, Massachusetts |
| William Henry Harrison | | Berkeley Plantation, Charles City County, Virginia |
| Zachary Taylor | | Hare Forest Farm, Orange County, Virginia |
| Zachary Taylor | | Zachary Taylor House, Louisville, Kentucky |
| John Tyler | | Greenway Plantation, Charles City County, Virginia |
| James Buchanan | | Buchanan's Birthplace State Park, Cove Gap, Pennsylvania |
| James K. Polk | | President James K. Polk Historic Site, Pineville, North Carolina |
| Franklin Pierce | | Franklin Pierce Homestead, Hillsborough, New Hampshire |
| Andrew Johnson | | Mordecai Historic Park, Raleigh, North Carolina |
| Abraham Lincoln | | Abraham Lincoln Birthplace National Historical Park, Hodgenville, Kentucky |
| Abraham Lincoln | | Lincoln Boyhood National Memorial, Lincoln City, Indiana |
| Ulysses S. Grant | | Grant Birthplace, Point Pleasant, Ohio |
| Rutherford B. Hayes | | Spiegel Grove, Fremont, Ohio |
| Chester A. Arthur | | Chester Alan Arthur State Historic Site, Fairfield, Vermont |
| Grover Cleveland | | Grover Cleveland Birthplace, Caldwell, New Jersey |
| William McKinley | | McKinley Birthplace Home and Research Center, Niles, Ohio |
| Theodore Roosevelt | | Theodore Roosevelt Birthplace National Historic Site, New York City, New York |
| William Howard Taft | | William Howard Taft National Historic Site, Cincinnati, Ohio |
| Woodrow Wilson | | Woodrow Wilson Birthplace and Presidential Library, Staunton, Virginia |
| Woodrow Wilson | | Woodrow Wilson Boyhood Home, Augusta, Georgia |
| Calvin Coolidge | | Calvin Coolidge Homestead District, Plymouth, Vermont |
| Herbert Hoover | | Herbert Hoover National Historic Site, West Branch, Iowa |
| Herbert Hoover | | Hoover–Minthorn House, Newberg, Oregon |
| Franklin D. Roosevelt | | Home of Franklin D. Roosevelt National Historic Site, Hyde Park, New York |
| Harry S. Truman | | Harry S Truman Birthplace State Historic Site, Lamar, Missouri |
| Dwight D. Eisenhower | | Eisenhower Boyhood Home, Abilene, Kansas |
| John F. Kennedy | | John Fitzgerald Kennedy National Historic Site, Brookline, Massachusetts |
| Lyndon B. Johnson | | Lyndon B. Johnson National Historical Park, Stonewall, Texas |
| Ronald Reagan | | Birthplace of Ronald Reagan, Tampico, Illinois |
| Richard Nixon | | Birthplace of Richard Nixon, Yorba Linda, California |
| Gerald Ford | | President Gerald R. Ford Jr. Boyhood Home, Grand Rapids, Michigan |
| Jimmy Carter | | Jimmy Carter National Historical Park, Plains, Georgia |
| George W. Bush | | George W. Bush Childhood Home, Midland, Texas |
| Bill Clinton | | President William Jefferson Clinton Birthplace Home National Historic Site, Hope, Arkansas |

Birthplaces of U.S. presidents

== States of primary affiliation ==
A list of U.S. presidents including the state with which each was primarily affiliated or most closely associated with, due to residence, professional career, and electoral history.

| OP | President | State |
|---|---|---|
| 1 | George Washington | Virginia |
| 2 | John Adams | Massachusetts |
| 3 | Thomas Jefferson | Virginia |
| 4 | James Madison | Virginia |
| 5 | James Monroe | Virginia |
| 6 | John Quincy Adams | Massachusetts |
| 7 | Andrew Jackson | Tennessee |
| 8 | Martin Van Buren | New York |
| 9 | William Henry Harrison | Ohio |
| 10 | John Tyler | Virginia |
| 11 | James K. Polk | Tennessee |
| 12 | Zachary Taylor | Kentucky (Note: Although a resident of Louisiana during the 1848 election and throughout his presidency, Taylor spent his entire childhood in Louisville, volunteered for the Kentucky militia, commissioned the Kentuckian 7th Infantry Regiment at Terre aux Boeufs, and is buried in a cemetery in Louisville named after him. According to Zachary Taylor: The American Presidents Series: The 12th President, 1849–1850 states on p. 11 ~ "Taylor's home state of Kentucky,...") |
| 13 | Millard Fillmore | New York |
| 14 | Franklin Pierce | New Hampshire |
| 15 | James Buchanan | Pennsylvania |
| 16 | Abraham Lincoln | Illinois |
| 17 | Andrew Johnson | Tennessee |
| 18 | Ulysses S. Grant | Ohio |
| 19 | Rutherford B. Hayes | Ohio |
| 20 | James A. Garfield | Ohio |
| 21 | Chester A. Arthur | New York |
| 22 | Grover Cleveland | New Jersey |
| 23 | Benjamin Harrison | Indiana |
| 24 | Grover Cleveland | New Jersey |
| 25 | William McKinley | Ohio |
| 26 | Theodore Roosevelt | New York |
| 27 | William Howard Taft | Ohio |
| 28 | Woodrow Wilson | Virginia |
| 29 | Warren G. Harding | Ohio |
| 30 | Calvin Coolidge | Massachusetts |
| 31 | Herbert Hoover | Iowa |
| 32 | Franklin D. Roosevelt | New York |
| 33 | Harry S. Truman | Missouri |
| 34 | Dwight D. Eisenhower | Kansas (Note: Eisenhower held residency in New York during the 1952 presidential election and later in Pennsylvania during the 1956 presidential election, but was primarily raised in Kansas and later settled back there.) |
| 35 | John F. Kennedy | Massachusetts |
| 36 | Lyndon B. Johnson | Texas |
| 37 | Richard Nixon | California (Note: Nixon's official state of residence when he was first elected President in 1968 and during his first year as President was New York because he moved there to practice law after his defeat in the 1962 California gubernatorial election. After becoming president, Nixon bought a home in California in early May 1969, sold his New York home in mid-May, and re-established his residency in California by early June.) |
| 38 | Gerald Ford | Michigan |
| 39 | Jimmy Carter | Georgia |
| 40 | Ronald Reagan | California |
| 41 | George H. W. Bush | Texas |
| 42 | Bill Clinton | Arkansas |
| 43 | George W. Bush | Texas |
| 44 | Barack Obama | Illinois |
| 45 | Donald Trump | New York |
| 46 | Joe Biden | Delaware |
| 47 | Donald Trump | Florida |

=== Presidents by state of primary affiliation ===
A list of U.S. presidents grouped by primary state of residence and birth, with priority given to residence. Only 20 out of the 50 states are represented. Presidents with an asterisk (*) did not primarily reside in their respective birth states (they were not born in the state listed below).

| State | # | Presidents (in order of presidency) |
|---|---|---|
| Ohio | 6 | William Henry Harrison* (9), Rutherford B. Hayes (19), James A. Garfield (20), William McKinley (25), William Howard Taft (27), Warren G. Harding (29) |
| Virginia | 6 | George Washington (1), Thomas Jefferson (3), James Madison (4), James Monroe (5), John Tyler (10), Woodrow Wilson (28) |
| New York | 6 | Martin Van Buren (8), Millard Fillmore (13), Chester A. Arthur* (21), Theodore Roosevelt (26), Franklin D. Roosevelt (32), Donald Trump (45) (Note: Trump resided in New York for his 2016 election as 45th president, and in Florida for his 2024 election as the 47th) |
| Massachusetts | 4 | John Adams (2), John Quincy Adams (6), Calvin Coolidge* (30), John F. Kennedy (35) |
| Tennessee | 3 | Andrew Jackson* (7), James K. Polk* (11), Andrew Johnson* (17) |
| Texas | 3 | Lyndon B. Johnson (36), George H. W. Bush* (41), George W. Bush* (43) |
| Illinois | 3 | Abraham Lincoln* (16),Ulysses S. Grant* (18), Barack Obama* (44) |
| California | 2 | Richard Nixon (37), Ronald Reagan* (40) |
| Arkansas | 1 | Bill Clinton (42) |
| Delaware | 1 | Joe Biden* (46) |
| Georgia | 1 | Jimmy Carter (39) |
| Indiana | 1 | Benjamin Harrison* (23) |
| Iowa | 1 | Herbert Hoover* |
| Kansas | 1 | Dwight D. Eisenhower* (34) |
| Kentucky | 1 | Zachary Taylor* (12) |
| Michigan | 1 | Gerald Ford* (38) |
| Missouri | 1 | Harry S. Truman (33) |
| New Hampshire | 1 | Franklin Pierce (14) |
| New Jersey | 1 | Grover Cleveland* (22, 24) |
| Pennsylvania | 1 | James Buchanan (15) |
| Florida | 1 | Donald Trump* (47) |

== See also ==
- List of vice presidents of the United States by home state
