= Virginia dynasty =

Four of the first five presidents of the United States

The Virginia dynasty is a term sometimes used to describe the fact that four of the first five presidents of the United States were from Virginia. The term sometimes excludes George Washington, who, though a Virginia planter, was closely aligned with the policies of the Federalist Party, and was succeeded by his vice president, John Adams of Massachusetts. The first five presidents were, in order, George Washington, John Adams, Thomas Jefferson, James Madison, and James Monroe.

The defeat of Adams in 1800 by Jefferson, his vice president who had previously served as Washington's secretary of state, marked the true beginning of the Virginia dynasty. The dynasty is usually associated with what is now called the Democratic-Republican Party, although it was generally referred to as simply the "Republican", "Democratic", or "Jeffersonian" Party at the time. Jefferson served two terms before retiring, in the Washingtonian precedent. He was succeeded by Madison, his secretary of state who was known as the "Father of the Constitution" for his role in drafting the document. Although the War of 1812 greatly weakened Madison's popularity in the Northeast, especially in New England which consequently discussed secession, he was easily re-elected in 1812. Madison was able to aid Monroe, another Virginian who had remained loyal to him and the party, in winning the presidency in 1816. Every member of the dynasty owned a large number of slaves.

By the end of Monroe's first term the Federalist Party had essentially disbanded and Monroe was re-elected in 1820 without any real opposition, receiving every electoral vote except one, which went for Secretary of State John Quincy Adams, John Adams' son. Monroe's second term marked the end of the Virginia dynasty. In the election of 1824, supporters of Virginia-born Georgia politician William H. Crawford portrayed him as "the rightful and legitimate successor of the Virginia Dynasty", but the Democratic-Republican Party splintered. John Quincy Adams won the disputed 1824 election over General Andrew Jackson of Tennessee, then considered to be part of the Southwest.

After Virginia contributed four of the first five presidents, who held office for 32 of the first 36 years under the Constitution, four other natives of Virginia have so far served as president. They were William Henry Harrison, Virginia-born but elected as a resident of Ohio; John Tyler, who was elected vice president in 1840 as Harrison's running mate, but wound up serving all but the first month of the latter's term after Harrison became the first president to die in office; Zachary Taylor, who made his name as a Kentucky resident and resided in Louisiana at the time of his election; and Woodrow Wilson, who was a Virginia native but became the nation's chief executive after serving as president of Princeton University and governor of New Jersey.

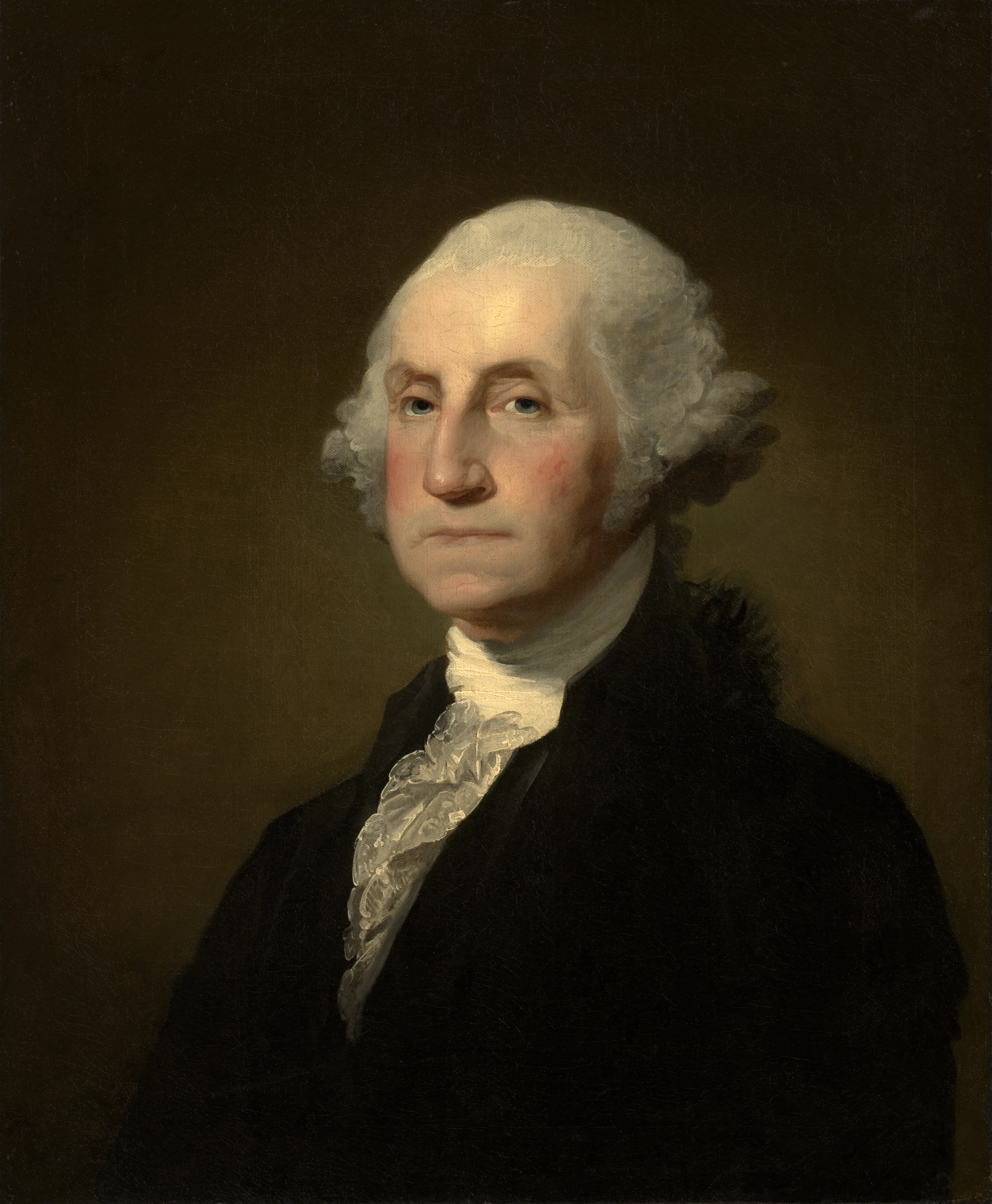
George Washington (1789–1797)

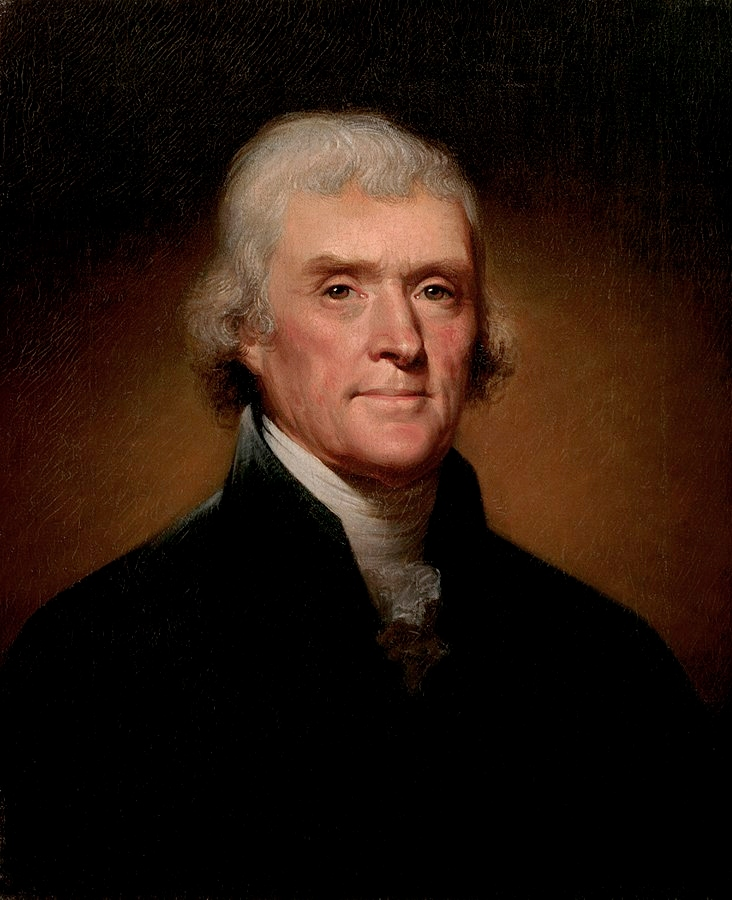
Thomas Jefferson (1801–1809)

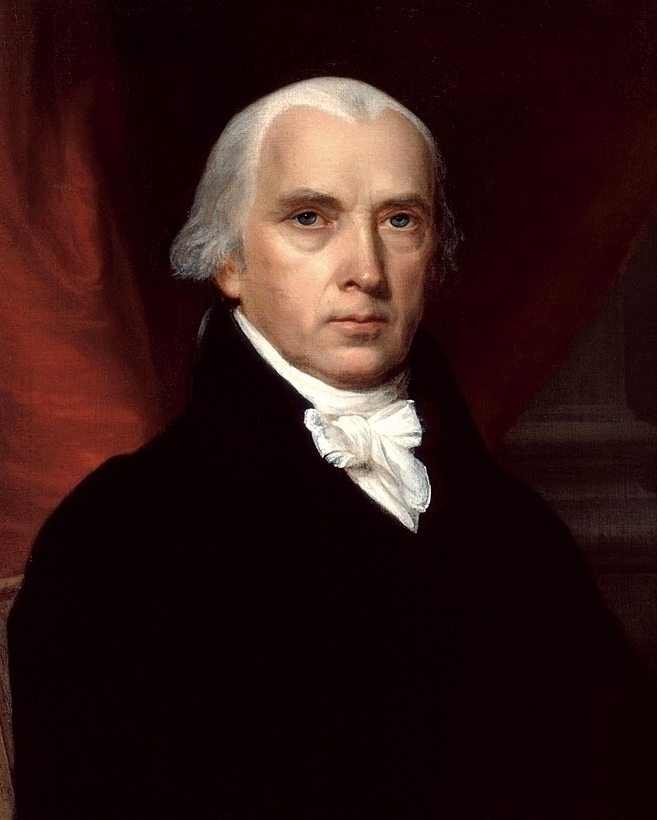
James Madison (1809–1817)

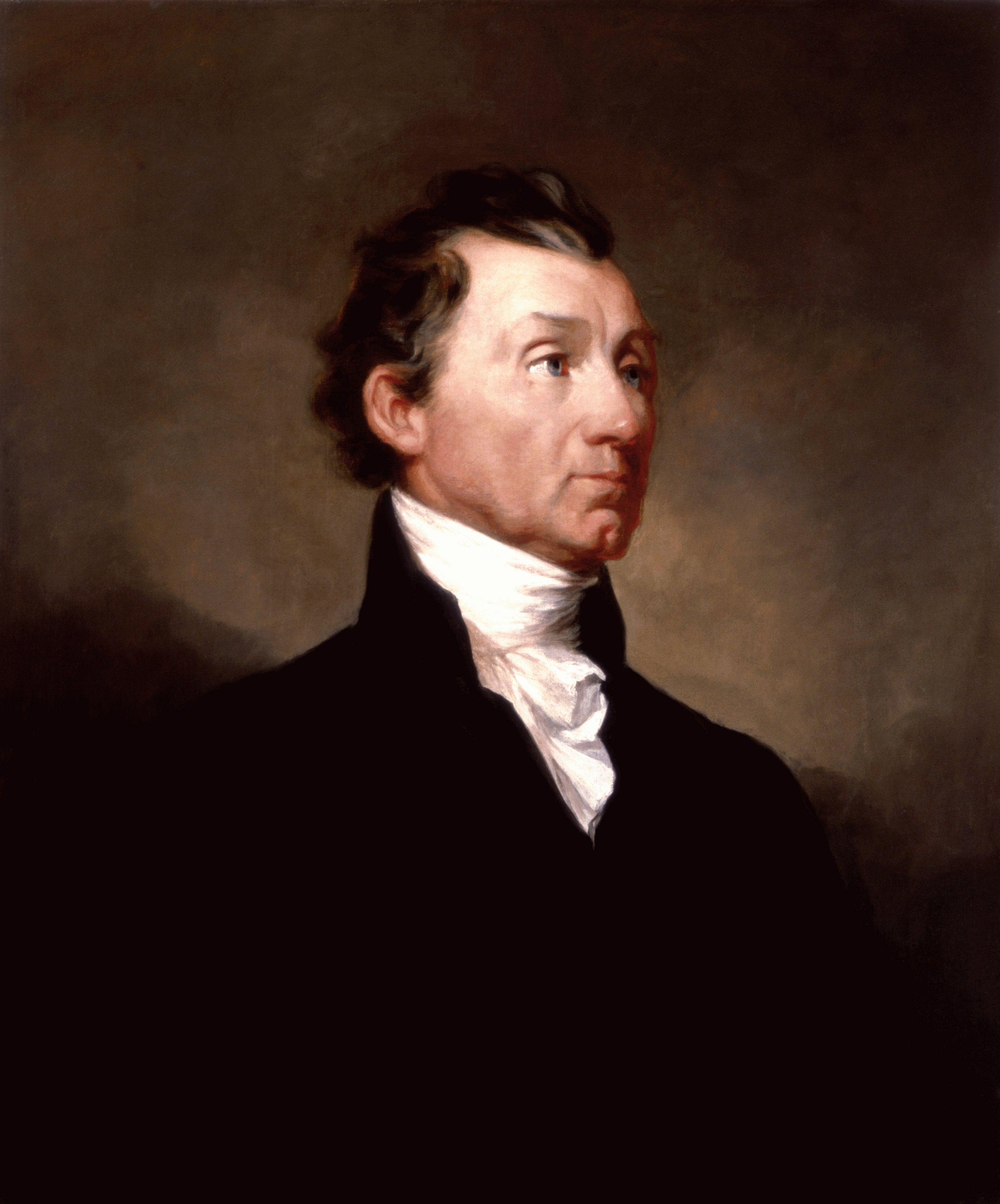
James Monroe (1817–1825)

== See also ==
- List of presidents of the United States by home state
