= Presidency of James Madison =

U.S. presidential administration from 1809 to 1817

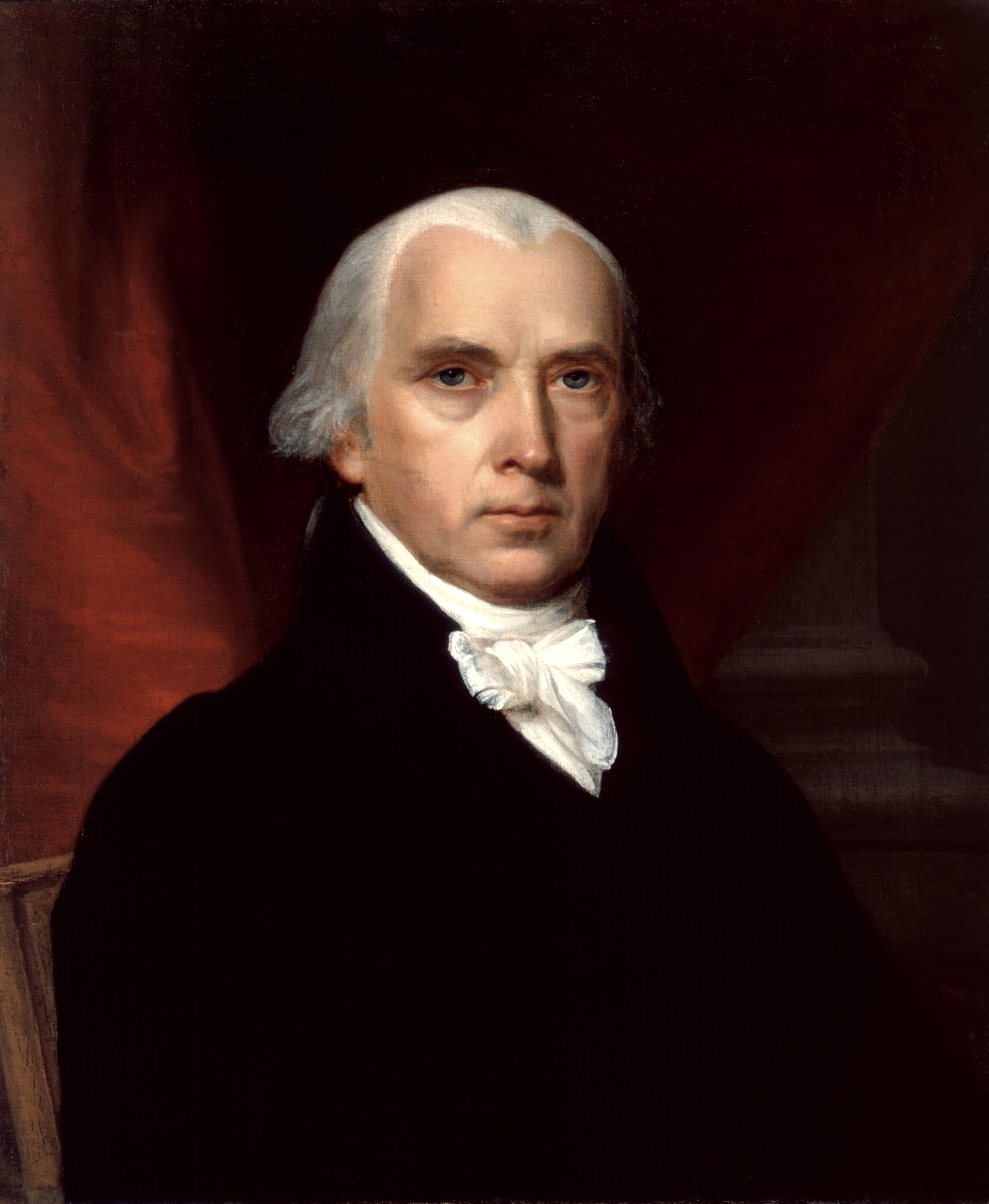
- Presidency of James Madison; March 4, 1809 – March 4, 1817
- Vice President: George Clinton (1809–1812); None (1812–1813) (Note: Vice Presidents Clinton and Gerry both died in office. Neither was replaced for the remainder of their respective terms, as the Constitution did not have a provision for filling a vice presidential vacancy prior to the adoption of the Twenty-fifth Amendment in 1967.); Elbridge Gerry (1813–1814); None (1814–1817)
- Cabinet: See list
- Party: Democratic-Republican
- Election: 1808; 1812
- Seat: White House
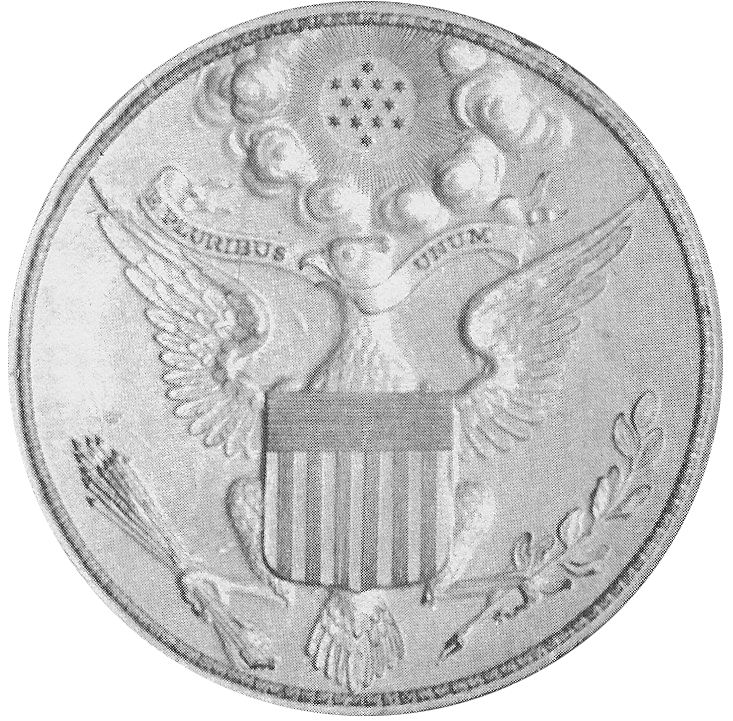
- Dorsett seal

James Madison was the fourth president of the United States from March 4, 1809, to March 4, 1817. Madison took office after defeating Federalist Charles Cotesworth Pinckney decisively in the 1808 presidential election. He was re-elected in 1812, defeating DeWitt Clinton. His presidency was dominated by the War of 1812 with Britain. After serving two terms as president, Madison was succeeded in 1817 by James Monroe, his Secretary of State and a fellow member of the Democratic-Republican Party.

Madison's presidency was dominated by the effects of the ongoing Napoleonic Wars. Initially, American merchants had benefited from the conflicts in Europe since it allowed them to increase their shipping activities, but both British and French authorities began seizing American ships trading with the other side. Anglo-American tensions gradually worsened until the United States declared war on Britain, beginning the War of 1812. The war was an administrative morass, as the United States had neither a strong army nor financial system, and several American invasions of Canada were repulsed. In 1814, the British occupied Washington and burnt the White House and the Capitol. However, the United States won several notable naval victories and crushed the resistance of British-allied Native Americans in the West. Shortly after the American triumph at the Battle of New Orleans, the war ended with the ratification of the Treaty of Ghent, in which neither party made major concessions. Despite the lack of gains in the war, the timing of the treaty convinced many Americans that the United States had won a great victory in the war, and Madison's popularity grew. The Federalists collapsed as a national party in the aftermath of the war, which they had strongly opposed.

Madison entered office intending to continue the limited government legacy of his Democratic-Republican predecessor, Thomas Jefferson. However, in the aftermath of the war, Madison favored higher tariffs, increased military spending, and the establishment of the Second Bank of the United States. Despite opposition from strict constructionists like John Randolph, much of Madison's post-war agenda was enacted. Madison left office highly popular, and his chosen successor, James Monroe, was elected with little opposition. Though many historians are critical of Madison's presidency, he is generally ranked as an above average president in polls of historians and political scientists.

== Election of 1808 ==
1808 electoral vote results

With Thomas Jefferson's second term winding down, and Jefferson's decision to retire widely known, Madison emerged as the leading presidential contender in the Democratic-Republican Party in 1808. Madison's candidacy faced resistance from Congressman John Randolph, the leader of a Democratic-Republican group known as the Tertium Quids, which opposed many of Jefferson's policies. A separate group of Democratic-Republicans from New York favored nominating incumbent Vice President George Clinton for president. At the congressional nominating caucus, Madison defeated Clinton and the favored candidate of the Tertium Quid, James Monroe. As the opposition Federalist Party by this time had largely collapsed outside New England, Madison easily defeated its candidate, Charles Cotesworth Pinckney, in the general election. Madison won 122 electoral votes to Pinckney's 47 votes, while Clinton received 6 electoral votes for president from his home state of New York. Clinton was also re-elected as vice president, easily defeating Federalist Rufus King for vice president.

The main issue of the election was the Embargo Act of 1807, a general embargo placed on all ships and vessels in U.S. ports and harbors. The banning of exports had hurt merchants and other commercial interests, although it encouraged domestic manufactures. These economic difficulties revived the Federalist opposition, especially in trade-dependent New England. This election was the first of only two instances in American history in which a new president would be elected but the incumbent vice president would continue in office.

== Administration ==
=== Cabinet ===
Madison cabinet
Office	Name	Term
President	James Madison	1809–1817
Vice President	George Clinton	1809–1812
none	1812–1813
Elbridge Gerry	1813–1814
none	1814–1817
Secretary of State	Robert Smith	1809–1811
James Monroe	1811–1817
Secretary of the Treasury	Albert Gallatin	1809–1814
George W. Campbell	1814
Alexander J. Dallas	1814–1816
William H. Crawford	1816–1817
Secretary of War	William Eustis	1809–1813
John Armstrong Jr.	1813–1814
James Monroe	1814–1815
William H. Crawford	1815–1816
George Graham (acting)	1816–1817
Attorney General	Caesar Augustus Rodney	1809–1811
William Pinkney	1811–1814
Richard Rush	1814–1817
Secretary of the Navy	Paul Hamilton	1809–1813
William Jones	1813–1814
Benjamin Williams Crowninshield	1815–1817

Upon his inauguration in 1809, Madison immediately faced opposition to his planned nomination of Secretary of the Treasury Albert Gallatin as Secretary of State. Madison chose not to fight Congress for the nomination but kept Gallatin, a carryover from the Jefferson administration, in the Treasury Department. The talented Swiss-born Gallatin was Madison's primary advisor, confidant, and policy planner. The other members of Madison's initial cabinet, selected more for geographical balance and partisan loyalty than for ability, were less helpful. Secretary of War William Eustis's only military experience had been as a surgeon during the American Revolutionary War, while Secretary of the Navy Paul Hamilton was an alcoholic. Madison appointed Secretary of State Robert Smith only at the behest of Smith's brother, the powerful Senator Samuel Smith; Madison had no affection for either brother. Vice President Clinton also actively worked to undermine Madison's presidency. With a cabinet full of those he distrusted, Madison rarely called cabinet meetings and instead frequently consulted with Gallatin alone.

After feuding with Gallatin, Smith was dismissed in 1811 in favor of James Monroe, and Monroe became a major influence in the Madison administration. Madison appointed several new cabinet members after winning re-election. Hamilton was finally replaced by William Jones, while John Armstrong Jr. replaced Eustis, much to the dismay of Monroe, who hated Armstrong. During the War of 1812, Gallatin was sent as a peace envoy to Europe and was successively replaced as Treasury Secretary by Jones (on an interim basis), George W. Campbell, and finally Alexander Dallas. A frustrated Madison dismissed Armstrong after several failures, replacing him with Monroe. Richard Rush, Benjamin Williams Crowninshield, and Dallas also joined the cabinet in 1814.

=== Vice Presidents ===
Two persons served as vice president under Madison. George Clinton served from March 4, 1809, until his death on April 20, 1812. Clinton was the first vice president to die in office. As no constitutional provision existed for filling an intra-term vacancy in the vice presidency prior to ratification of the Twenty-fifth Amendment in 1967, the office was left vacant. After the Democratic-Republican ticket's victory in the 1812 presidential election, Elbridge Gerry took office on March 4, 1813. He served until his death on November 23, 1814; the vice presidency remained vacant for the remainder of Madison's second term. Madison is the only president to have had two vice presidents die while in office.

=== Ambassadorial appointments ===
Madison appointed William Pinkney, who had been co-minister with James Monroe for the preceding two years, ambassador to Great Britain. Pinkney came home in 1811. Madison replaced him with Jonathan Russell, who served until the outbreak of war in 1812. Upon resumption of the peace John Quincy Adams took over this post, having relinquished the office of ambassador to Russia. Madison appointed James A. Bayard to replace Adams in Russia, but he refused the post. It remained vacant until the following administration. For France, Madison left Jefferson's appointee John Armstrong in office until 1810. Madison replaced him with the poet Joel Barlow, who died of pneumonia near the front in Poland. Madison replaced him with William H. Crawford until 1814 and then former Treasury Secretary Albert Gallatin. For Spain Madison kept Chargé d'Affaires George W. Erving, a holdover from the Jefferson administration, raising the post to Minister Plenipotentiary in 1814. For Portugal, Madison appointed Thomas Sumter Jr.

== Judicial appointments ==
Madison had the opportunity to fill two vacancies on the Supreme Court during his presidency. The first came late in 1810, following the death of Associate Justice William Cushing. As Supreme Court justices of the time had to ride circuit, Madison had to find a replacement for Cushing who lived in Massachusetts from New England, but there were few qualified potential nominees who were compatible ideologically and politically. At Jefferson's recommendation, Madison first offered the position to former Attorney General Levi Lincoln Sr., but he declined due to ailing health. Madison then nominated Alexander Wolcott, an undisguised partisan of the Democratic-Republicans, but Wolcott was rejected by the Senate. The next nominee was John Quincy Adams, then serving as the ambassador to Russia, but Adams declined as he hoped to one day run for president. Finally, over the objections of Jefferson, Madison offered the position to Joseph Story, a young Democratic-Republican lawyer who had voted against the embargo during his one term in the House. Story was quickly confirmed by the Senate, and would serve until 1845. Another vacancy arose in 1811, following the death of Associate Justice Samuel Chase. Madison nominated Gabriel Duvall to fill the vacancy on November 15, 1811. Duvall was confirmed by the Senate on November 18, 1811, and received commission the same day. Though Jefferson and Madison had hoped to weaken Chief Justice John Marshall's influence on the Marshall Court, neither of Madison's appointments altered the Federalist ideological leanings of the court.

Madison appointed eleven other federal judges, two to the United States Circuit Court of the District of Columbia, and nine to the various United States district courts. One of those judges was appointed twice, to different seats on the same court.

== Pre-war economic policies ==
Madison sought to continue Jefferson's agenda, and in his inaugural address he called for low taxes and a reduction of the national debt. One of the most pressing issues Madison confronted upon taking office was the future of the First Bank of the United States, as the bank's twenty-year charter was scheduled to expire in 1811. A second major issue was the economy, which had entered a slump late in Jefferson's second term. Gallatin favored renewing the bank's charter since it served as an important source of capital and a safe place to deposit government funds, especially in tough economic times. However, most Democratic-Republicans hated the bank, which they saw as a corrupt tool of city-based elites. Madison did not take a strong stand on the issue, and Congress allowed the national bank's charter to lapse. Over the next five years, the number of state-chartered banks more than tripled. Many of these banks issued their own banknotes, and those banknotes became an important part of the U.S. monetary system, as the federal government itself did not issue banknotes at that time.

== West Florida ==
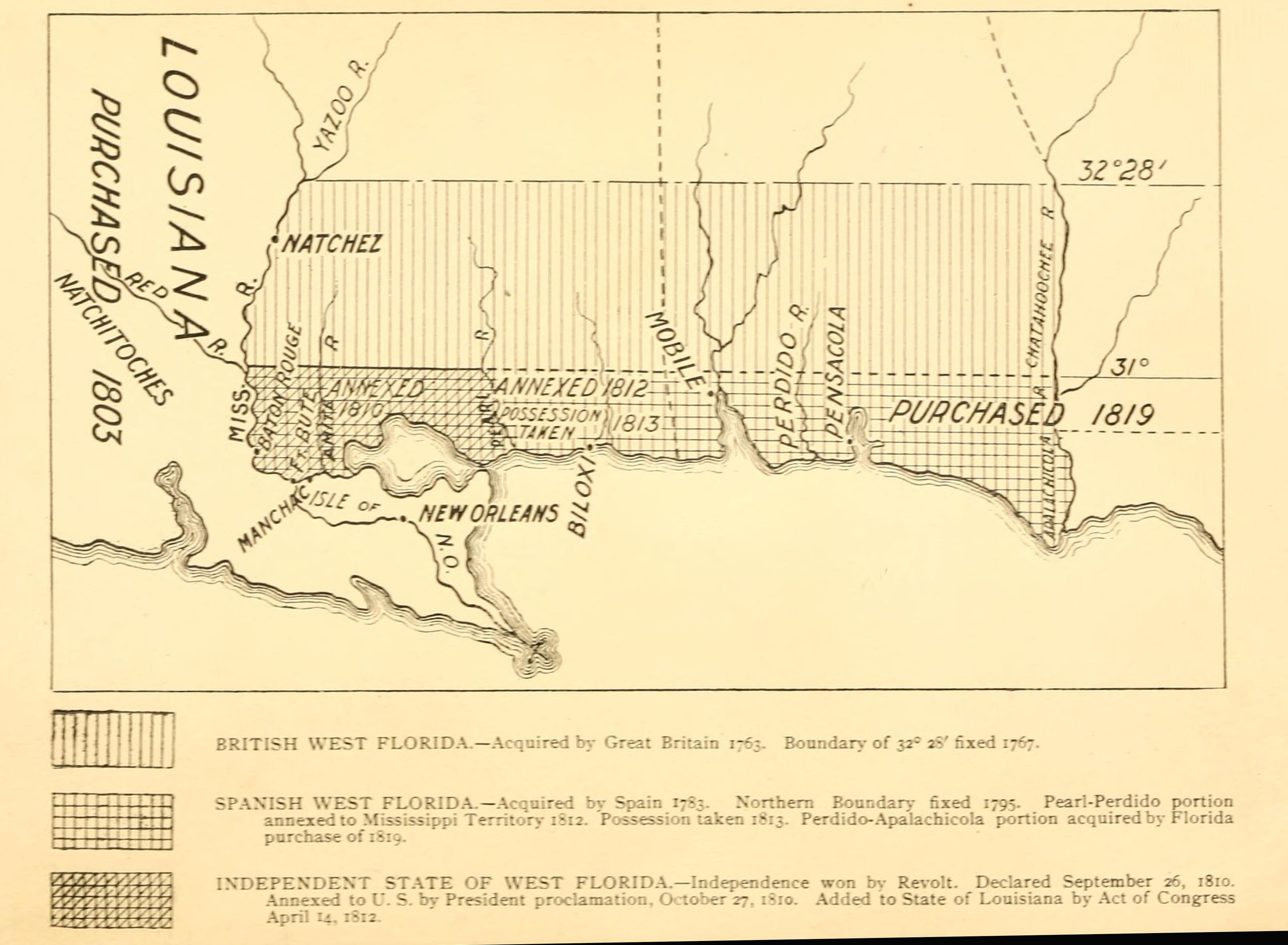
A sketch map published in 1898 showing the territorial changes of "West Florida"^{p 2}

The acquisition of West Florida from Spain had been one of President Jefferson's major goals. Jefferson and James Monroe, who had negotiated the Louisiana Purchase, contended that the purchase had included West Florida, and Madison continued to uphold this claim. Spanish control of its New World colonies had weakened due to the ongoing Peninsular War, and Spain exercised little effective control over West Florida and East Florida. Madison was especially concerned about the possibility of the British taking control of the region, which, along with Canada, would give the British Empire control of territories on the northern and southern borders of the United States. However, the United States was reluctant to go to war for the territory when France or Great Britain might intervene.

Madison sent William Wykoff into West Florida in the hopes of convincing the settlers of the region to request annexation by the United States. Partly due to Wykoff's prodding, the people of West Florida held the St. Johns Plains Convention in July 1810. Most of those elected to the convention had been born in the U.S. and largely favored independence from Spain. However, they feared that declaring independence would provoke a Spanish military response. In September 1810, after learning that the Spanish governor of West Florida had requested military assistance from Spain, a militia made up of West Floridians and led by Philemon Thomas captured the Spanish fort at Baton Rouge. The leaders of the St. Johns Plains Convention declared the establishment of the Republic of West Florida and requested that Madison send troops to prevent a Spanish reprisal. Acting on his own initiative, the governor of Mississippi Territory, David Holmes, ordered U.S. Army soldiers into West Florida. In what became known as the October Proclamation, Madison announced that the United States had taken control of the Republic of West Florida, assigning it to the Territory of Orleans. Spain retained control of the portion of West Florida east of the Perdido River. Madison also employed George Mathews to stir up a rebellion against Spain in East Florida and the remaining Spanish portions of West Florida, but this effort proved unsuccessful. Spain would later recognize U.S. control of West Florida in the 1819 Adams–Onís Treaty, in which Spain also ceded control of East Florida.

== Wilkinson affair ==
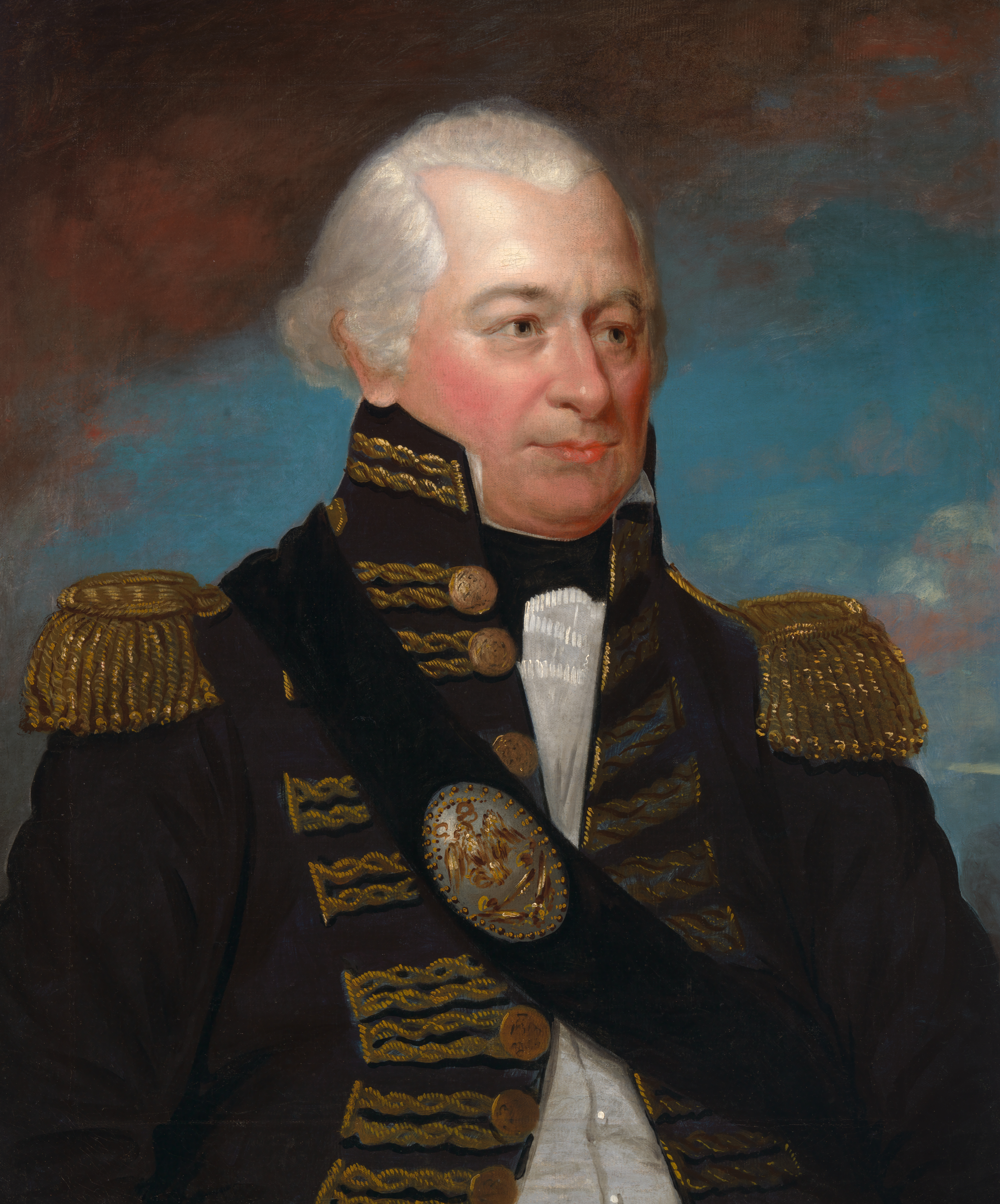
James Wilkinson, c. 1820

General James Wilkinson had been appointed governor of the Louisiana Territory by Jefferson in 1805. In 1809, Madison placed Wilkinson in charge of Terre aux Boeufs on the Louisiana coast to protect the U.S. from invasion. Wilkinson proved to be an incompetent general; many soldiers complained that he was ineffectual: their tents were defective, and they became sick by malaria, dysentery, and scurvy; dozens died daily. Wilkinson made excuses and a long Congressional investigation was inconclusive. Madison retained Wilkinson because of his political influence in Pennsylvania. After Wilkinson suffered two defeats at British hands, Madison finally relieved him from active duty in 1812. Historian Robert Allen Rutland states the Wilkinson affair left "scars on the War Department" and "left Madison surrounded by senior military incompetents ..." at the beginning of the War of 1812.

== War of 1812 ==
=== Prelude to war ===
The French Revolutionary Wars and the Napoleonic Wars had engulfed Europe since the early 1790s. Napoleon had won a decisive victory at the Battle of Austerlitz in 1805, and as a consequence Europe remained mostly at peace for the next few years, but tensions continued on the high seas, where the United States had long traded with both France and Britain. The United States benefited from these wars for much of the period prior to 1807, as American shipping expanded and Napoleon sold Louisiana Territory to the United States. In 1807, the British government announced the Orders in Council, which called for a blockade on the French Empire. The French announced a policy that allowed for seizures on any American ships that traded with British ports, but this policy had relatively little effect due to the dominance of the Royal Navy. In response to British and French seizures of American shipping, the Jefferson administration had passed the Embargo Act of 1807, which cut off American trade with Europe. Congress repealed this act shortly before Madison became president. In early 1809, Congress passed the Non-Intercourse Act, which opened trade with foreign powers other than France and Britain. Aside from U.S. trade with France, the central dispute between Great Britain and the United States was the British impressment of sailors from American ships. During the long and expensive war against France, tens of thousands of Britons had been impressed into the Royal Navy, with many of them deserting and finding work on U.S. merchantmen. Unable to tolerate this loss of manpower, the Royal Navy began stopping U.S. ships and impressing alleged deserters. Though this outraged the Americans, they also refused to take steps to limit it, such as refusing to hire British sailors. For economic reasons, American merchants preferred facing the risk of impressment to giving up their ability to hire British sailors.

Although initially promising, President Madison's diplomatic efforts to get the British to withdraw the Orders in Council were rejected by Britain's Foreign Secretary George Canning in April 1809. In August 1809, American relations with Britain deteriorated as the British ambassador, David Erskine, was replaced by the "hatchet man" Francis James Jackson. Madison resisted calls for war, as he was ideologically opposed to the debt and taxes necessary for a war effort. The British historian Paul Langford sees the replacement of Erskine in 1809 as a major blunder:

The British ambassador in Washington [Erskine] brought affairs almost to an accommodation, and was ultimately disappointed not by American intransigence but by one of the outstanding diplomatic blunders made by a Foreign Secretary. It was Canning who, in his most irresponsible manner and apparently out of sheer dislike of everything American, recalled the ambassador Erskine and wrecked the negotiations, a piece of most gratuitous folly. As a result, the possibility of a new embarrassment for Napoleon turned into the certainty of a much more serious one for his enemy. Though the British cabinet eventually made the necessary concessions on the score of the Orders-in-Council, in response to the pressures of industrial lobbying at home, its action came too late.... The loss of the North American markets could have been a decisive blow. As it was by the time the United States declared war, the Continental System [of Napoleon] was beginning to crack, and the danger correspondingly diminishing. Even so, the war, inconclusive though it proved in a military sense, was an irksome and expensive embarrassment which British statesman could have done much more to avert.

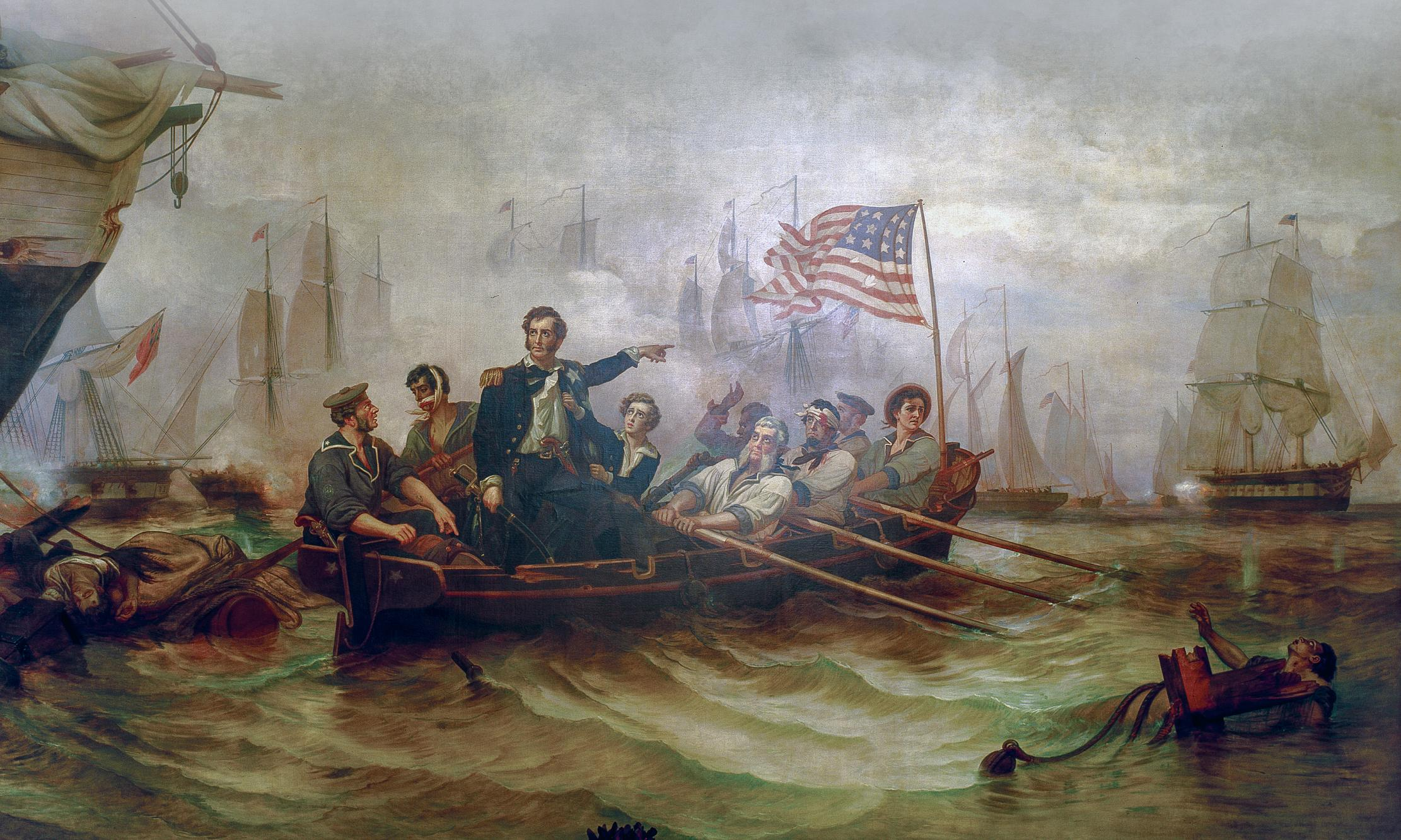
Painting of Commodore Oliver Hazard Perry at the 1813 Battle of Lake Erie in 1813 by Powell

After Jackson accused Madison of duplicity with Erskine, Madison had Jackson barred from the State Department and sent packing to Boston. In early 1810, Madison began asking Congress for more appropriations to increase the army and navy in preparation for war with Britain. Congress also passed an act known as Macon's Bill Number 2, which reopened trade with France and Britain, but promised to reimpose the embargo on one country if the other country agreed to end its attacks on American shipping. Madison, who wished to simply continue the embargo, opposed the law, but he jumped at the chance to use the law's provision enabling a re-imposition of the embargo on one power. Seeking to split the Americans and British, Napoleon offered to end French seizures of American shipping so long as the United States punished any countries that did not similarly end restrictions on trade. Madison accepted Napoleon's proposal in the hope that it would convince the British to revoke the Orders-in-Council, though this did not happen. Despite assurances to the contrary, the French also continued to seize American shipping.

As the seizures of American shipping continued, both Madison and the broader American public were ready for war with Britain. Some observers believed that the United States might fight a three-way war with both Britain and France, but Democratic-Republicans, including Madison, considered Britain to be far more culpable than France. Many Americans called for a "second war of independence" to restore honor and stature to the new nation, and an angry public elected a "war hawk" Congress, led by Henry Clay and John C. Calhoun. With Britain in the midst of the Napoleonic Wars, many Americans, Madison included, believed that the United States could easily capture Canada from Britain, at which point the U.S. could use it as a bargaining chip for all other Anglo-American disputes or simply retain control of it. On June 1, 1812, Madison asked Congress for a declaration of war. The declaration was passed along sectional and party lines, with intense opposition from the Federalists and the Northeast, where the economy had suffered during Jefferson's trade embargo.

Madison hurriedly called on Congress to put the country "into an armor and an attitude demanded by the crisis," specifically recommending enlarging the army, preparing the militia, finishing the military academy, stockpiling munitions, and expanding the navy. Madison faced formidable obstacles—a divided cabinet, a factious party, a recalcitrant Congress, obstructionist governors, and incompetent generals, together with militia who refused to fight outside their states. The most serious problem facing the war effort was lack of unified popular support. There were serious threats of disunion from New England, which engaged in extensive smuggling with Canada and refused to provide financial support or soldiers. Events in Europe also went against the United States. Shortly after the United States declared war, Napoleon launched an invasion of Russia, and the failure of the invasion turned the tide against French and towards Britain and its allies. In the years prior to the war, Jefferson and Madison had reduced the size of the military, closed the Bank of the U.S., and lowered taxes. These decisions added to the challenges facing the United States, as by the time the war began, Madison's military force consisted mostly of poorly trained militia members.

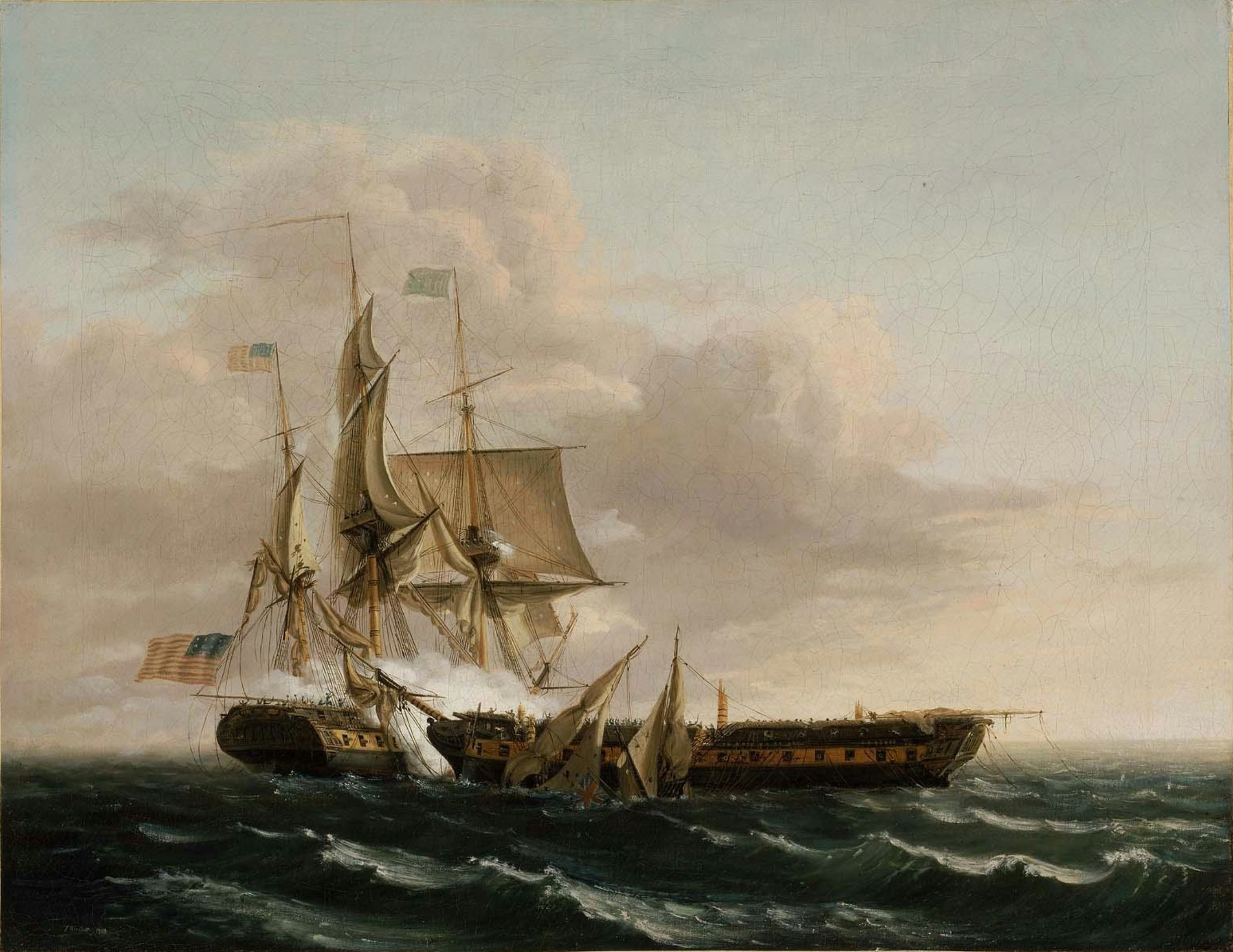
USS Constitution defeats HMS Guerriere, a significant event during the war.

=== Military action ===
Madison hoped that the war would end in a few months after the American occupation of Canada, but his hopes were quickly dashed. Madison had believed the state militias would rally to the flag and invade Canada, but the governors in the Northeast failed to cooperate. Their militias either sat out the war or refused to leave their respective states for action. The senior command at the War Department and in the field proved incompetent or cowardly— General William Hull surrendered Fort Detroit to a smaller British force without firing a shot. Gallatin discovered the war was almost impossible to fund, since the national bank had been closed, major financiers in the New England refused to help, and government revenue depended largely on tariffs. Though the Democratic-Republican Congress was willing to go against party principle to authorize an expanded military, they refused to levy direct taxes until June 1813. Lacking adequate revenue, and with its request for loans refused by New England bankers, the Madison administration relied heavily on high-interest loans furnished by bankers based in New York City and Philadelphia. Another American invasion of Canada, led by Henry Dearborn, ended with defeat at the Battle of Stoney Creek. Meanwhile, the British armed American Indians, most notably several tribes allied with the Shawnee chief, Tecumseh, in an attempt to threaten American positions in the Northwest.

After the disastrous start to the War of 1812, Madison accepted a Russian invitation to arbitrate the war and sent Gallatin, John Quincy Adams, and James Bayard to Europe in hopes of quickly ending the war. While Madison worked to end the war, the U.S. experienced some military success, particularly at sea. The United States had built up one of the largest merchant fleets in the world, though it had been partially dismantled under Jefferson and Madison. Madison authorized many of these ships to become privateers in the war, and they captured 1,800 British ships. As part of the war effort, an American naval shipyard was built up at Sackets Harbor, New York, where thousands of men produced twelve warships and had another nearly ready by the end of the war. The U.S. naval squadron on Lake Erie successfully defended itself and captured its opponents, crippling the supply and reinforcement of British ground forces in the western theater of the war. In the aftermath of the Battle of Lake Erie, General William Henry Harrison defeated the forces of the British and of Tecumseh's Confederacy at the Battle of the Thames. The death of Tecumseh in that battle represented the permanent end of armed Native American resistance in the Old Northwest. In March 1814, General Andrew Jackson broke the resistance of the British-allied Muscogee in the Old Southwest with his victory at the Battle of Horseshoe Bend. Despite those successes, the British continued to repel American attempts to invade Canada, and a British force captured Fort Niagara and burned the American city of Buffalo in late 1813. In early 1814, the British agreed to begin peace negotiations in the town of Ghent, and the British pushed for the establishment of an Indian barrier state in the Old Northwest as part of any peace agreement.

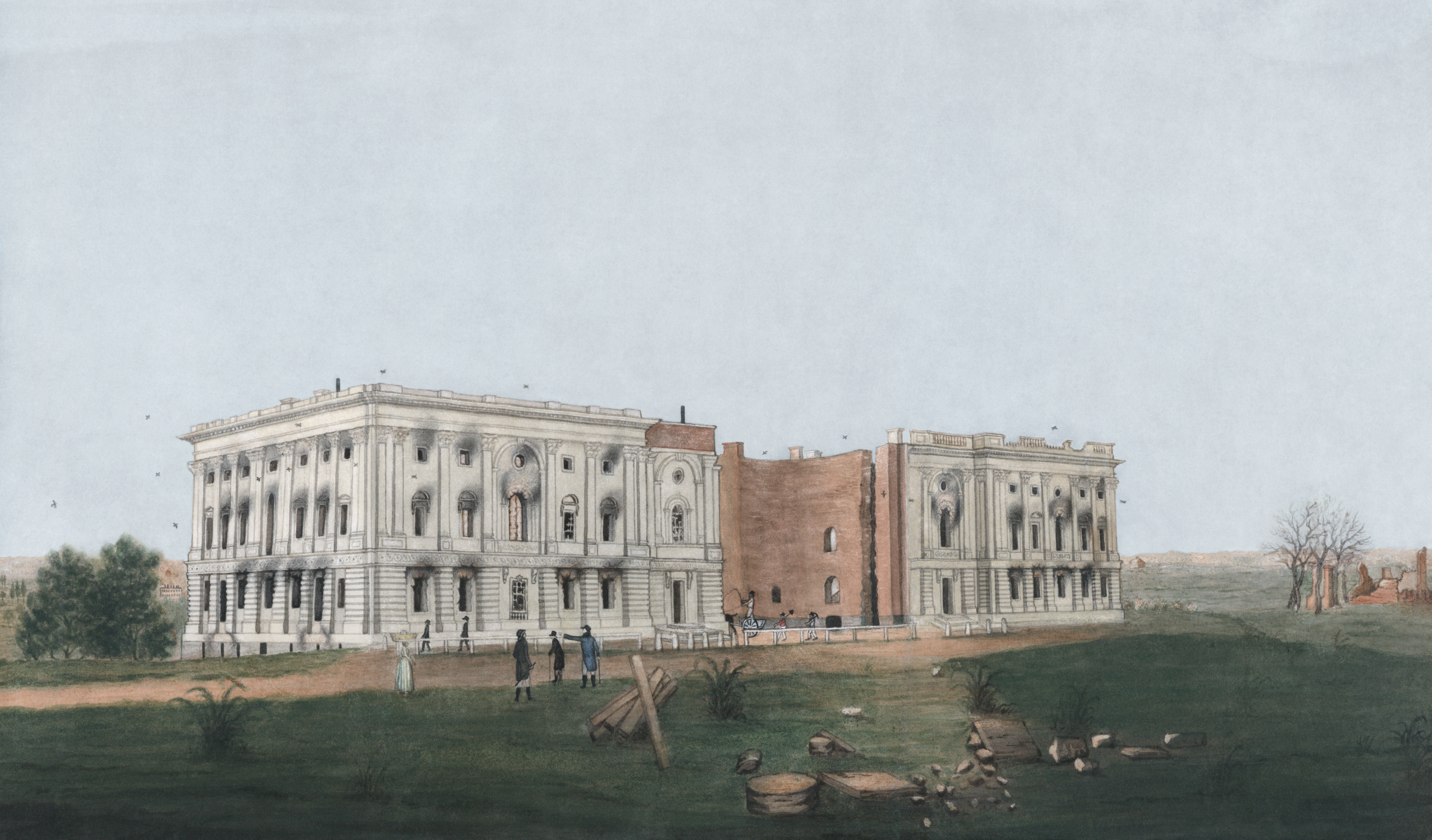
The unfinished United States Capitol was set ablaze by the British on August 24, 1814.

After Napoleon's abdication following the March 1814 Battle of Paris, the British began to shift troops to North America. Under General George Izard and General Jacob Brown, the U.S. launched another invasion of Canada in mid-1814. Despite an American victory at the Battle of Chippawa, the invasion stalled once again. Meanwhile, the British increased the size and intensity of their raids against the Atlantic coast. General William H. Winder attempted to bring together a concentrated force to guard against a potential attack on Washington or Baltimore, but his orders were countermanded by Secretary of War Armstrong. The British landed a large force off the Chesapeake Bay in August 1814, and the British army approached Washington on August 24. An American force was routed at the Battle of Bladensburg during which Madison himself took control of some artillery units and directed their attacks, this event being notable as the only time in American history in which a sitting president directed troops in the battlefield; although Madison reportedly performed poorly as a military commander and his efforts were ultimately futile as the battle was eventually lost. Having won at Bladensburg, British forces entered Washington and set fire to its federal buildings. Dolley Madison rescued White House valuables and documents shortly before the British burned the White House. The British army next moved on Baltimore, but the British called off the raid after the U.S. repelled a naval attack on Fort McHenry. Madison returned to Washington before the end of August, and the main British force departed from the region in September. The British attempted to launch an invasion from Canada, but the U.S. victory at the September 1814 Battle of Plattsburgh ended British hopes of conquering New York.

Anticipating that the British would attack the city of New Orleans next, newly installed Secretary of War James Monroe ordered General Jackson to prepare a defense of the city. Meanwhile, the British public began to turn against the war in North America, and British leaders began to look for a quick exit from the conflict. On January 8, 1815, Jackson's force defeated the British at the Battle of New Orleans. Just over a month later, Madison learned that his negotiators had reached the Treaty of Ghent, ending the war without major concessions by either side. Additionally, both sides agreed to establish commissions to settle Anglo-American boundary disputes. Madison quickly sent the Treaty of Ghent to the Senate, and the Senate ratified the treaty on February 16, 1815. To most Americans, the quick succession of events at the end of the war, including the burning of the capital, the Battle of New Orleans, and the Treaty of Ghent, appeared as though American valor at New Orleans had forced the British to end their involvement in the war. This view, while inaccurate, strongly contributed to the post-war euphoria that persisted for a decade. It also helps explain the significance of the war, even if it was inconclusive. Madison's reputation as president improved and Americans finally believed the United States had established itself as a world power. Napoleon's defeat at the June 1815 Battle of Waterloo brought a permanent end to the Napoleonic Wars, and negotiations between the U.S. and Britain regarding the demilitarization of the Great Lakes led to the signing of the Rush–Bagot Treaty shortly after Madison left office.

== Postwar ==
=== Collapse of the Federalists ===
By 1809, the Federalist Party was no longer competitive outside a few strongholds. Many once-prominent Federalists, including ambassador John Quincy Adams, had joined Madison's Republican Party. The Federalist Party's standing would continue to decline during Madison's presidency. The War of 1812 was extremely unpopular in New England, and in December 1814 delegates from the six New England states met at the Hartford Convention to discuss their grievances. Though some at the convention sought secession, most were not yet willing to call for such a drastic action. The convention sent a delegation, led by Harrison Gray Otis, to Washington, D.C., where the delegates asked for several amendments to the Constitution. The delegates arrived shortly after news of both the Battle of New Orleans and the Treaty of Ghent, and the Hartford delegation was largely ignored by Congress. Madison, who had worried that the convention would lead to outright revolt, was relieved that the major outcome of the convention was the request of several impracticable amendments. The Hartford Convention delegates had largely been Federalists, and with Americans celebrating a successful "second war of independence" from Britain, the Hartford Convention became a political millstone around the Federalist Party. After the War of 1812, the Federalist Party slid into national oblivion, although the party would retain pockets of support into the 1820s.

=== Economic policy ===
The 14th Congress convened in December 1815, several months after the end of the War of 1812. Recognizing the difficulties of financing the war and the necessity of an institution designed to help regulate currency, Madison proposed the re-establishment of a national bank. He also favored increased spending on the Army and the Navy, as well as a tariff designed to protect American goods from foreign competition. Madison noted that internal improvements like roads and canals helped promote economic prosperity as well as unity within the United States, and he called for a constitutional amendment to explicitly authorize federal spending on internal improvements. These initiatives represented a major change in course for the Democratic-Republican president, and were opposed by strict constructionists like John Randolph, who stated that Madison's proposals "out-Hamiltons Alexander Hamilton." Madison's tariff proposal did win the support of Jefferson, who stated that "we must now place the manufacturer by the side of the agriculturalist.

Responding to Madison's proposals, the 14th Congress compiled one of the most productive legislative records up to that point in history. Madison won the enactment of the Tariff of 1816 relatively easily. The tariff legislation set high import duties for all goods that were produced in the United States at levels that could meet domestic demand; after three years, the rates would decline to approximately 20 percent. Congressman John C. Calhoun argued that the new tariff help create a diversified, self-sufficient economy. The chartering of the new Second Bank of the United States received more opposition, but Congress nonetheless passed a bill granting the bank a twenty-five-year charter. Under the terms of the bill, the United States supplied one-fifth of the capital for the new bank and would select one quarter of the membership of bank's board of directors. Some Tertium Quids like Nathaniel Macon argued that the national bank was unconstitutional, but Madison asserted that the operation of the First Bank of the United States had settled the issue of constitutionality.

Madison also approved federal spending on the Cumberland Road, which provided a link to the country's western lands. Congress planned for the road to extend from Baltimore to St. Louis, which would help provide for the settlement of lands formerly occupied by Tecumseh's Confederacy. In his last act before leaving office, Madison vetoed the Bonus Bill of 1817, which would have financed more internal improvements, including roads, bridges, and canals. In making the veto, Madison argued that the General Welfare Clause did not broadly authorize federal spending on internal improvements.

While Madison presided over the implementation of new legislation, Secretary of the Treasury Dallas reorganized the Treasury Department, brought the government budget back into surplus, and put the nation back on the specie system that relied on gold and silver. In 1816, pensions were extended to orphans and widows of the War of 1812 for a period of 5 years at the rate of half pay.

=== Second Barbary War ===
During the War of 1812, the Barbary States had stepped up attacks on American shipping. These states, which were nominally vassals of the Ottoman Empire but were functionally independent, demanded tribute from countries that traded in the Mediterranean Sea. With the end of the war, the United States could deploy the now-expanded U.S. Navy against the Barbary States. Congress declared war on Algiers in March 1815, beginning the Second Barbary War. Seventeen ships, the largest U.S. fleet that had been assembled up to that point in history, were sent to the Mediterranean Sea. After several defeats, Algiers agreed to sign a treaty, and Tunis and Tripoli also subsequently signed treaties. The Barbary States agreed to release all of their prisoners and to stop demanding tributes.

=== Indian policy ===
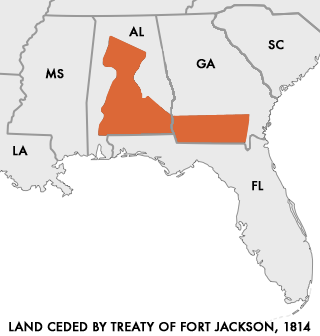

Madison had a paternalistic attitude toward American Indians, encouraging the men to give up hunting and become farmers. He stated in 1809 that the federal government's duty was to convert the American Indians by the "participation of the improvements of which the human mind and manners are susceptible in a civilized state". As president, Madison often met with Southeastern and Western Indians, including the Creek and Osage. After his victory at the Battle of Horseshoe Bend, Jackson forced the defeated Muscogee to sign the Treaty of Fort Jackson, which forced the Muscogee and the Cherokee (who had been allied with Jackson) to give up control of 22 million acres of land in Alabama and Georgia. Madison initially agreed to restore these lands in the Treaty of Ghent, but Madison backed down in the face of Jackson's resistance. The British abandoned their erstwhile allies, and the U.S. consolidated control of its southwest and northwest frontiers.

== Other domestic issues ==
=== Constitutional amendments ===
In May 1810, Congress approved an amendment to the United States Constitution that would strip United States citizenship from any citizen who accepted a title of nobility from a foreign country, and submitted it to the state legislatures for ratification. However, the proposed amendment, commonly known as the Titles of Nobility Amendment, was not ratified by the requisite number of states, and is technically still pending before the states.

=== States admitted to the Union ===
Two new states were admitted to the Union while Madison was in office:

- Louisiana – April 30, 1812
- Indiana – December 11, 1816

== Elections ==
=== Election of 1812 ===
1812 electoral vote results

The poorly attended 1812 Democratic-Republican congressional caucus met in May 1812, and Madison was re-nominated without opposition. A dissident group of New York Democratic-Republicans nominated DeWitt Clinton, the Lieutenant Governor of New York and the nephew of recently deceased Vice President George Clinton, to oppose Madison in the 1812 election. This faction of Democratic-Republicans hoped to unseat the president by forging a coalition among Republicans opposed to the coming war, Democratic-Republicans angry with Madison for not moving more decisively toward war, northerners weary of the Virginia dynasty and southern control of the White House, and disgruntled New Englanders who wanted almost anyone over Madison. Dismayed about their prospects of beating Madison, a group of top Federalists met with Clinton's supporters to discuss a unification strategy. Difficult as it was for them to join forces, they nominated Clinton for President and Jared Ingersoll, a Philadelphia lawyer, for vice president.

Hoping to shore up his support in the Northeast, where the War of 1812 was unpopular, Madison selected Governor Elbridge Gerry of Massachusetts as his running mate. Despite the maneuverings of Clinton and the Federalists, Madison won re-election, though by the narrowest margin of any election since the election of 1800. He received 128 electoral votes to 89 for Clinton. Federalists made gains in most states outside of the South, but Pennsylvania's support for Madison ensured that the incumbent won a majority of the electoral vote. The election proved to be the last one of significance for the Federalist party, as the party never again mounted a strong challenge for the presidency.

=== Election of 1816 ===
1816 electoral vote results

In the 1816 presidential election, Madison and Jefferson both favored the candidacy of another Virginian, Secretary of State James Monroe. With the support of Madison and Jefferson, Monroe defeated Secretary of War William H. Crawford in the party's congressional nominating caucus. Governor Daniel Tompkins of New York agreed to serve as Monroe's running mate. As the Federalist Party continued to collapse as a national party, Monroe easily defeated Federalist Rufus King in the 1816 election. In the congressional elections, dozens of members of the House of Representatives from both parties lost re-election due to public anger over an act that raised congressional salaries.

== Historical reputation ==
Although the Madison presidency ended on a popular high note, with a sense of victory in a second war of independence, historians have been much more critical. The praise Madison receives from historians comes largely from his achievements before 1800. Historians are blistering in criticizing Madison's conduct of the war. Henry Steele Commager and Richard B. Morris in 1968 said the conventional view of Madison was as an "incapable President" who "mismanaged an unnecessary war." Wood commends Madison for his steady leadership during the war and resolve to avoid expanding the president's power, noting one contemporary's observation that the war was conducted "without one trial for treason, or even one prosecution for libel." Garry Wills identifies four main causes of his failure in the conduct of the war: he made no provision for intelligence, he tolerated a confused command structure, political influence trumped ability in his selection of senior military and civilian appointments, and he trusted the militia more than a standing professional army.

In civilian affairs, Marshall Smelser argues that Madison allowed Congress to seize powers from the presidency, not in the constitutional sense, but as a practical matter. The Republican Party Caucus took control of nominating the next president, so it became the cockpit for high-level political maneuvering, leaving the president in the cold. Furthermore, congressional caucuses, standing committees, and the Speaker gained new powers, such as the ability to block nominations. Madison was unable to get the Senate to approve Gallatin as the Secretary of State. Smelser concludes:

the Presidency was weaker in 1815 than at any earlier time. The Congress made policy and, to some extent, influenced administrative detail. Madison's conduct has brought him condemnation as a weakling.

Summarizing all of the evaluations of Madison, Skidmore concludes:

He blundered, he deferred excessively to Congress, and he took the United States deliberately into war that could have been disastrous—and was in fact disastrous to the extent that it led to destruction of the national capitol. Some of his actions reflected a view incompatible with continued development of the modern nation state. Nevertheless, other of his actions strengthened the constitutional system. Additionally, he prepared the country—perhaps unconsciously—truly to enter the new century, and in many ways he conducted himself in a manner that could serve as a model for presidents, even today....One could look only at the accomplishments and conclude that Madison's presidency was "great." Or by considering only his failures of leadership could conclude that it was weak and bumbling.

Polls of historians and political scientists tend to rank Madison as an above average president. A 2018 poll of the American Political Science Association's Presidents and Executive Politics section ranked Madison as the twelfth best president. A 2017 C-SPAN poll of historians ranked Madison as the seventeenth best president. A 2006 poll of historians ranked Madison's failure to prevent the War of 1812 as the sixth-worst mistake made by a sitting president.
