= List of vice presidents of the United States by home state =

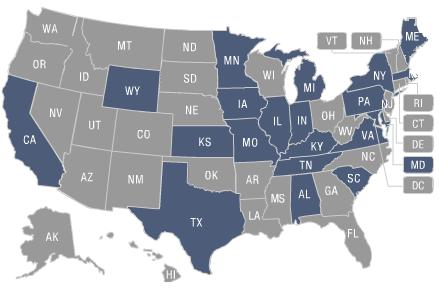
Places represented by vice presidents (affiliation place)

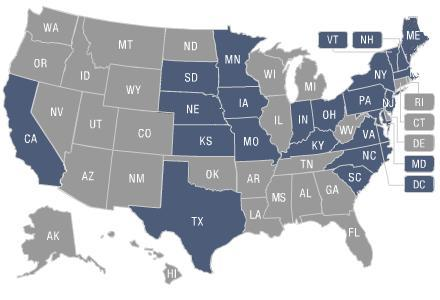
Birth places of vice presidents

This is a list of vice presidents of the United States by place of primary affiliation. Some vice presidents have been born in one state, but are commonly associated with another. New York was the birth state of eight vice presidents, the most of any state: George Clinton, Daniel D. Tompkins, Martin Van Buren, Millard Fillmore, Schuyler Colfax, William A. Wheeler, Theodore Roosevelt, and James S. Sherman. New York was also the home state of an additional four vice presidents—Aaron Burr, Chester A. Arthur, Levi P. Morton, and Nelson Rockefeller.

While political pundits have traditionally argued that the vice-presidential candidates have little effect on election outcomes in their home state, in 2016, political scientists Boris Heersink and Brenton D. Peterson argued that vice-presidential candidates did in fact offer a home-state advantage. In an article published in American Politics Research, they presented analysis of elections spanning 1884 to 1992, which "suggest that vice-presidential candidates increase their tickets’ performance in their home states by 2.67 percentage points on average—considerably higher than previous studies have found."

== States of primary affiliation ==
Note: The flags presented for the states are the present day flags, which were not necessarily adopted in the times of the earliest vice presidents.

No.	Vice President	State	Ref
1	John Adams	Massachusetts	
2	Thomas Jefferson	Virginia	
3	Aaron Burr	New York	
4	George Clinton	New York	
5	Elbridge Gerry	Massachusetts	
6	Daniel D. Tompkins	New York	
7	John C. Calhoun	South Carolina	
8	Martin Van Buren	New York	
9	Richard M. Johnson	Kentucky	
10	John Tyler	Virginia	
11	George M. Dallas	Pennsylvania	
12	Millard Fillmore	New York	
13	William R. King	Alabama	
14	John C. Breckinridge	Kentucky	
15	Hannibal Hamlin	Maine	
16	Andrew Johnson	Tennessee	
17	Schuyler Colfax	Indiana	
18	Henry Wilson	Massachusetts	
19	William A. Wheeler	New York	
20	Chester A. Arthur	New York	
21	Thomas Hendricks	Indiana	
22	Levi P. Morton	New York	
23	Adlai Stevenson I	Illinois	
24	Garret Hobart	New Jersey	
25	Theodore Roosevelt	New York	
26	Charles W. Fairbanks	Indiana	
27	James S. Sherman	New York	
28	Thomas R. Marshall	Indiana	
29	Calvin Coolidge	Massachusetts	
30	Charles G. Dawes	Illinois	
31	Charles Curtis	Kansas	
32	John Nance Garner	Texas	
33	Henry A. Wallace	Iowa	
34	Harry S. Truman	Missouri	
35	Alben W. Barkley	Kentucky	
36	Richard Nixon	California	
37	Lyndon B. Johnson	Texas	
38	Hubert Humphrey	Minnesota	
39	Spiro Agnew	Maryland	
40	Gerald Ford	Michigan	
41	Nelson Rockefeller	New York	
42	Walter Mondale	Minnesota	
43	George H. W. Bush	Texas	
44	Dan Quayle	Indiana	
45	Al Gore	Tennessee	
46	Dick Cheney	Wyoming	
47	Joe Biden	Delaware	
48	Mike Pence	Indiana	
49	Kamala Harris	California	
50	JD Vance	Ohio	

=== Vice presidents by state of primary affiliation ===
A list of U.S. vice presidents grouped by primary state of residence and birth, with priority given to residence. Only 23 out of the 50 states are represented. Vice presidents with an asterisk (*) did not primarily reside in their respective birth states (they were not born in the state listed below).

State	#	Vice presidents
New York	11	Aaron Burr* (3), George Clinton (4), Daniel D. Tompkins (6), Martin Van Buren (8), Millard Fillmore (12), William A. Wheeler (19), Chester A. Arthur* (20), Levi P. Morton* (22), Theodore Roosevelt (25), James S. Sherman (27), Nelson Rockefeller* (41)
Indiana	6	Schuyler Colfax* (17), Thomas A. Hendricks* (21), Charles W. Fairbanks* (26), Thomas R. Marshall (28), Dan Quayle (44), Mike Pence (48)
Massachusetts	4	John Adams (1), Elbridge Gerry (5), Henry Wilson* (18), Calvin Coolidge* (29)
Kentucky	3	Richard M. Johnson (9), John C. Breckinridge (14), Alben W. Barkley (35)
Texas	3	John Nance Garner (32), Lyndon B. Johnson (37), George H. W. Bush* (43)
California	2	Richard Nixon (36), Kamala Harris (49)
Illinois	2	Adlai Stevenson I* (23), Charles G. Dawes* (30)
Minnesota	2	Hubert Humphrey* (38), Walter Mondale (42)
Tennessee	2	Andrew Johnson* (16), Al Gore* (45)
Virginia	2	Thomas Jefferson (2), John Tyler (10)
Alabama	1	William R. King* (13)
Delaware	1	Joe Biden* (47)
Iowa	1	Henry A. Wallace (33)
Kansas	1	Charles Curtis (31)
Maine	1	Hannibal Hamlin (15)
Maryland	1	Spiro Agnew (39)
Michigan	1	Gerald Ford* (40)
Missouri	1	Harry S. Truman (34)
New Jersey	1	Garret Hobart (24)
Ohio	1	JD Vance (50)
Pennsylvania	1	George M. Dallas (11)
South Carolina	1	John C. Calhoun (7)
Wyoming	1	Dick Cheney* (46)

== Birth dates and birthplaces of U.S. vice presidents ==
The first Vice President to be born was John Adams in Braintree, Massachusetts.

^{†} = Colony, pre–1776, rather than state

‡ = Territory or federal district, rather than state

Birth order	Vice President	Date of birth	Birthplace	In office	Ref(s)
1	John Adams	October 30, 1735	Braintree, Massachusetts^{†}	(1st) April 21, 1789 – March 4, 1797	
2	George Clinton	July 26, 1739	Little Britain, New York^{†}	(4th) March 4, 1805 – April 20, 1812	
3	Thomas Jefferson	April 13, 1743	Shadwell, Virginia^{†}	(2nd) March 4, 1797 – March 4, 1801	
4	Elbridge Gerry	July 17, 1744	Marblehead, Massachusetts^{†}	(5th) March 4, 1813 – November 23, 1814	
5	Aaron Burr	February 6, 1756	Newark, New Jersey^{†}	(3rd) March 4, 1801 – March 4, 1805	
6	Daniel D. Tompkins	June 21, 1774	Scarsdale, New York^{†}	(6th) March 4, 1817 – March 4, 1825	
7	Richard M. Johnson	October 17, 1780	Beargrass, Virginia (Note: Now part of Kentucky)	(9th) March 4, 1837 – March 4, 1841	
8	John C. Calhoun	March 18, 1782	Abbeville, South Carolina	(7th) March 4, 1825 – December 28, 1832	
9	Martin Van Buren	December 5, 1782	Kinderhook, New York	(8th) March 4, 1833 – March 4, 1837	
10	William R. King	April 7, 1786	Sampson County, North Carolina	(13th) March 4, 1853 – April 18, 1853	
11	John Tyler	March 29, 1790	Charles City County, Virginia	(10th) March 4, 1841 – April 4, 1841	
12	George M. Dallas	July 10, 1792	Philadelphia, Pennsylvania	(11th) March 4, 1845 – March 4, 1849	
13	Millard Fillmore	January 7, 1800	Summerhill, New York	(12th) March 4, 1849 - July 9, 1850	
14	Andrew Johnson	December 29, 1808	Raleigh, North Carolina	(16th) March 4, 1865 – April 15, 1865	
15	Hannibal Hamlin	August 27, 1809	Paris, Massachusetts (Note: Now part of Maine)	(15th) March 4, 1861 – March 4, 1865	
16	Henry Wilson	February 16, 1812	Farmington, New Hampshire	(18th) March 4, 1873 – November 22, 1875	
17	William A. Wheeler	June 30, 1819	Malone, New York	(19th) March 4, 1877 – March 4, 1881	
18	Thomas A. Hendricks	September 7, 1819	Fultonham, Ohio	(21st) March 4, 1885 – November 25, 1885	
19	John C. Breckinridge	January 16, 1821	Lexington, Kentucky	(14th) March 4, 1857 – March 4, 1861	
20	Schuyler Colfax	March 23, 1823	New York City, New York	(17th) March 4, 1869 – March 4, 1873	
21	Levi P. Morton	May 16, 1824	Shoreham, Vermont	(22nd) March 4, 1889 – March 4, 1893	
22	Chester A. Arthur	October 5, 1829	Fairfield, Vermont	(20th) March 4, 1881 – September 19, 1881	
23	Adlai E. Stevenson	October 23, 1835	Christian County, Kentucky	(23rd) March 4, 1893 – March 4, 1897	
24	Garret Hobart	June 3, 1844	Long Branch, New Jersey	(24th) March 4, 1897 – November 21, 1899	
25	Charles W. Fairbanks	May 11, 1852	Unionville Center, Ohio	(26th) March 4, 1905 – March 4, 1909	
26	Thomas R. Marshall	March 14, 1854	North Manchester, Indiana	(28th) March 4, 1913 – March 4, 1921	
27	James S. Sherman	October 24, 1855	Utica, New York	(27th) March 4, 1909 – October 30, 1912	
28	Theodore Roosevelt	October 27, 1858	New York City, New York	(25th) March 4, 1901 - September 14, 1901	
29	Charles Curtis	January 25, 1860	Topeka, Kansas‡	(31st) March 4, 1929 – March 4, 1933	
30	Charles G. Dawes	August 27, 1865	Marietta, Ohio	(30th) March 4, 1925 – March 4, 1929	
31	John N. Garner	November 22, 1868	Detroit, Texas‡	(32nd) March 4, 1933 – January 20, 1941	
32	Calvin Coolidge	July 4, 1872	Plymouth, Vermont	(29th) March 4, 1921 - August 2, 1923	
33	Alben W. Barkley	November 24, 1877	Lowes, Kentucky	(35th) January 20, 1949 – January 20, 1953	
34	Harry S. Truman	May 8, 1884	Lamar, Missouri	(34th) January 20, 1945 - April 12, 1945	
35	Henry A. Wallace	October 7, 1888	Orient, Iowa	(33rd) January 20, 1941 – January 20, 1945	
36	Nelson Rockefeller	July 8, 1908	Bar Harbor, Maine	(41st) December 19, 1974 – January 20, 1977	
37	Lyndon B. Johnson	August 27, 1908	Stonewall, Texas	(37th) January 20, 1961 - November 22, 1963	
38	Hubert Humphrey	May 27, 1911	Wallace, South Dakota	(38th) January 20, 1965 – January 20, 1969	
39	Richard Nixon	January 9, 1913	Yorba Linda, California	(36th) January 20, 1953 – January 20, 1961	
40	Gerald Ford	July 14, 1913	Omaha, Nebraska	(40th) December 6, 1973 - August 9, 1974	
41	Spiro Agnew	November 9, 1918	Baltimore, Maryland	(39th) January 20, 1969 – October 10th, 1973	
42	George H. W. Bush	June 12, 1924	Milton, Massachusetts	(43rd) January 20, 1981 – January 20, 1989	
43	Walter Mondale	January 5, 1928	Ceylon, Minnesota	(42nd) January 20, 1977 – January 20, 1981	
44	Dick Cheney	January 30, 1941	Lincoln, Nebraska	(46th) January 20, 2001 – January 20, 2009	
45	Joe Biden	November 20, 1942	Scranton, Pennsylvania	(47th) January 20, 2009 – January 20, 2017	
46	Dan Quayle	February 4, 1947	Indianapolis, Indiana	(44th) January 20, 1989 – January 20, 1993	
47	Al Gore	March 31, 1948	District of Columbia‡	(45th) January 20, 1993 – January 20, 2001	
48	Mike Pence	June 7, 1959	Columbus, Indiana	(48th) January 20, 2017 – January 20, 2021	
49	Kamala Harris	October 20, 1964	Oakland, California	(49th) January 20, 2021 – January 20, 2025	
50	JD Vance	August 2, 1984	Middletown, Ohio	(50th) January 20, 2025 – Incumbent	

== Map of vice presidential birthplaces ==
Birthplaces of U.S. vice presidents

== See also ==
- List of presidents of the United States by home state
