= Hare Forest Farm =

Historic house in Virginia, United States

- U.S. National Register of Historic Places
- Virginia Landmarks Register
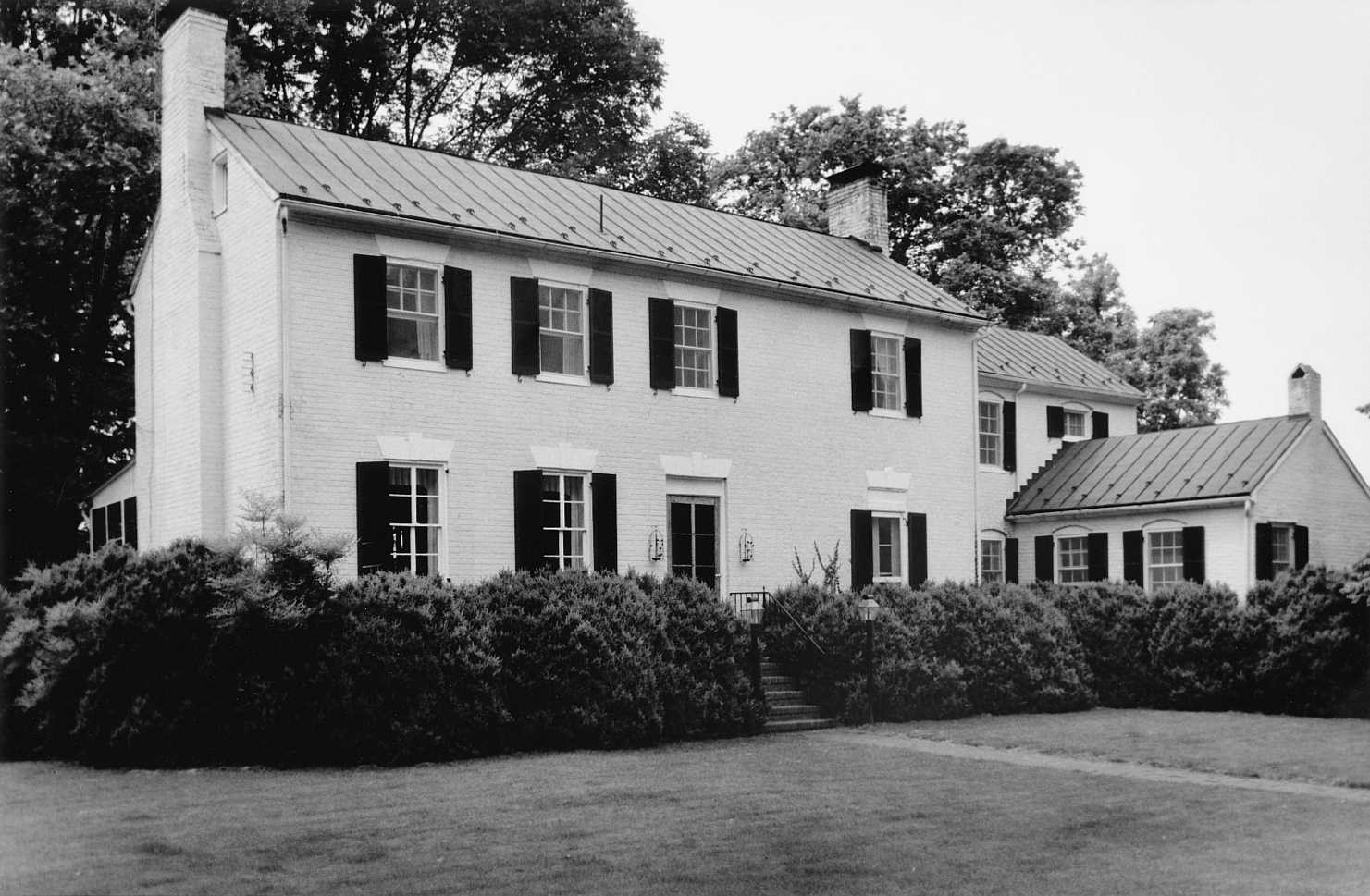
- Hare Forest Farm, Orange County, VA – Purported birthplace of Zachary Taylor (Wings to the right of main section added later)

- Location within Virginia Location within the United States
- Location: VA 700 W of jct. with VA 615, near Orange, Virginia
- Coordinates: 38°17′12″N 78°4′46″W
- Area: 62 acres (25 ha)
- Built: c. 1815
- Architectural style: Colonial Revival, Federal
- NRHP reference No.: 91002016
- VLR No.: 068-0124

Significant dates
- Added to NRHP: January 28, 1992
- Designated VLR: April 17, 1991

Hare Forest Farm is a historic home and farm complex located near Orange, Orange County, Virginia, United States. The main house was built in three sections starting about 1815. It consists of a two-story, four-bay, brick center block in the Federal style, a two-story brick dining room wing which dates from the early 20th century, and a mid-20th-century brick kitchen wing. Also on the property are the contributing stone garage, a 19th-century frame smokehouse with attached barn, an early-20th-century frame barn, a vacant early-20th-century tenant house, a stone tower, an early-20th-century frame tenant house, an abandoned storage house, as well as the stone foundations of three dwellings of undetermined date. The land was once owned by William Strother, maternal grandfather of Zachary Taylor, and it has often been claimed that the future president was born on the property.

It was listed on the National Register of Historic Places in 1992.
