= Harry S Truman Birthplace State Historic Site =

Historic house in Lamar, Missouri

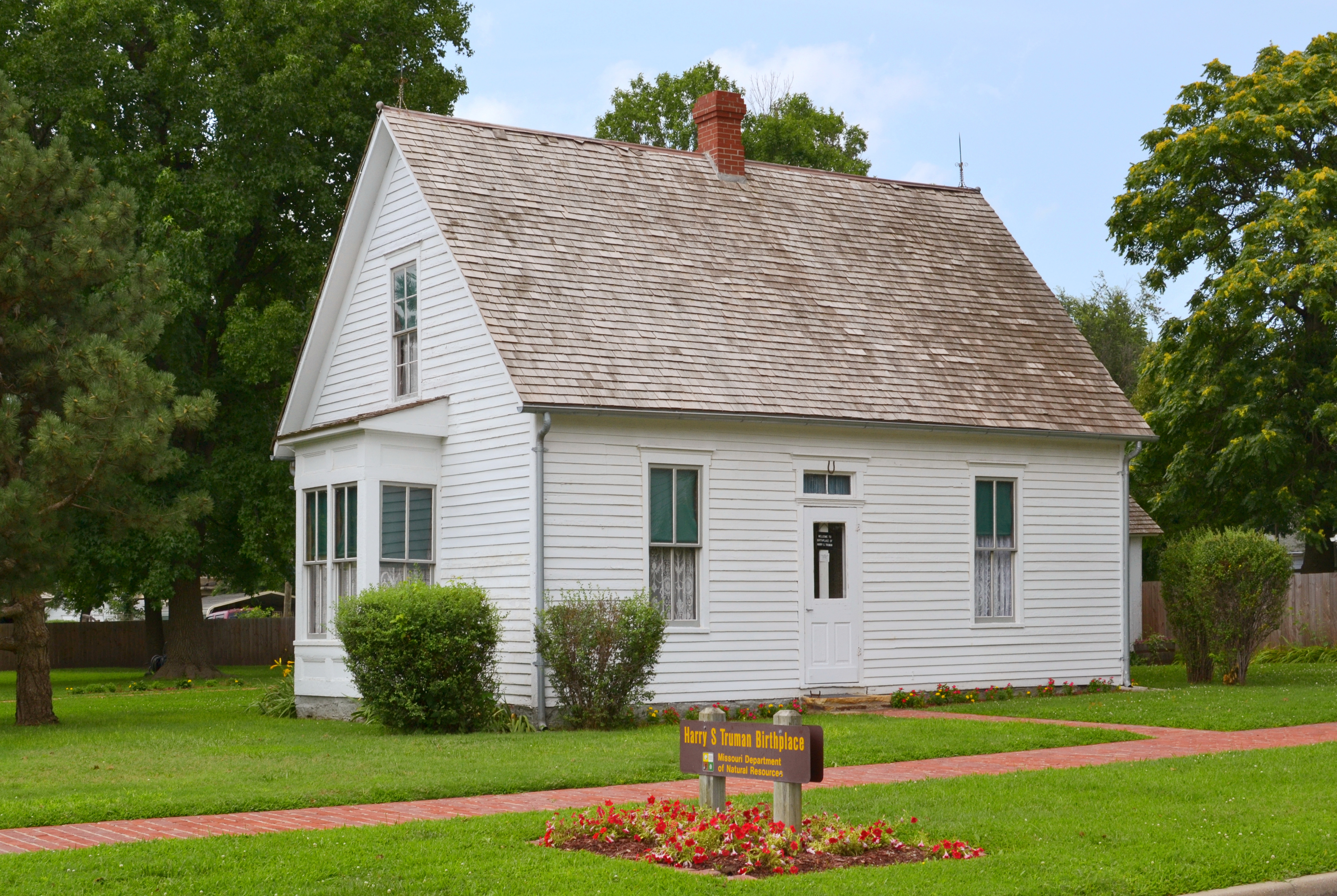

- Location within Missouri Location within the United States
- Location: Lamar, Barton County, Missouri, United States
- Coordinates: 37°29′37.49″N 94°16′16.35″W
- Area: 2.51 acres (1.02 ha)
- Established: 1957
- Visitors: 4,994 (in 2022)
- Governing body: Missouri Department of Natural Resources
- Website: Harry S Truman Birthplace State Historic Site
- Harry Truman Birthplace Memorial
- U.S. National Register of Historic Places
- Location: N corner, 11th St. and Truman Ave., Lamar, Missouri
- Coordinates: 37°29′43″N 94°16′16″W
- Area: Less than one acre
- Built: c. 1881
- Built by: Blethroad, Simon
- NRHP reference No.: 69000089
- Added to NRHP: June 23, 1969

The Harry S Truman Birthplace State Historic Site is a state-owned property in Lamar, Barton County, Missouri, maintained by the Missouri Department of Natural Resources, preserving the 1 1/2-story childhood home of Harry S. Truman, the 33rd President of the United States. The future president was born here on May 8, 1884, in the downstairs southwest bedroom. The home was purchased by the state in 1957 and dedicated as a historic site in 1959 at a ceremony attended by Truman himself. The site was added to the National Register of Historic Places in 1969.

== See also ==
- List of residences of presidents of the United States
