= Timeline of the Jimmy Carter presidency (1979) =

The following is a timeline of the presidency of Jimmy Carter, from January 1, 1979 to December 31, 1979.

== January ==
- January 1 – In a statement, President Carter announces the day marks the beginning of diplomatic relations between the United States and China.
- January 2 – President Carter holds an hour long Cabinet Room meeting with Prime Minister of Australia Malcolm Fraser, being said to have discussed "a broad range of global and regional topics of importance to Australia and the United States, including developments in Iran and the Middle East, the need for cooperation among the developed nations to combat inflation and restore economic health and stability throughout the world, and the recent United States decision to normalize relations with the People's Republic of China."
- January 2 – President Carter issues Executive Order 12111, deleting Assistant to the Secretary and Land Utilization Adviser in the Department of the Interior and replacing it with Counselor on Labor Management Relations in the Department of Commerce.
- January 4 – President Carter issues a memorandum on a program concerning federal pay and anti-inflation.
- January 4 – President Carter issues a memorandum to the Special Representative for Trade Negotiations on the subject of international trade agreements.
- January 4 – President Carter announces the immediate joining of the White House staff by William Simpson, who will take the position of Deputy Assistant to the President.
- January 4 – United States Attorney General Griffin Bell says the administration is willing to deport any foreign student that takes part in illegal violence in the US.
- January 4 – President Carter, First Lady Rosalynn Carter, and their youngest child Amy fly into Guadeloupe for two days of talks at a foundation summit. They arrive at Le Raizet Airport during the afternoon.
- January 5 – Government sources report that the Defense Department has drafted a new strategic policy intended to prevent or counter a Soviet nuclear strike.
- January 7 – Prime Minister of Israel Menachem Begin says Israel and Egypt are ready to negotiate again to continue the progression toward a peace treaty and were waiting for Washington to invite them back for talks while speaking to reporters. He insists the US government must take the initiative to bring the two countries together and states his hope that this will occur soon.
- January 7 – During a CBS appearance, United States Secretary of Energy James Schlesinger states the likelihood of a six to seven percent increase in gas prices that year and the possibility of Iranian oil stoppage leading to either rationing or government allocations of supplies in the event that it lasts longer than three months.
- January 8 – President Carter announces the nomination of K. Mathea Falco for Assistant Secretary of State for International Narcotics Matters.
- January 10 – President Carter issues Proclamation 4633, a proclamation designating February 1979 as "American Heart Month".
- January 11 – President Carter calls on Americans in a public statement to rededicate themselves to the principles of Martin Luther King Jr., given the upcoming (January 15) fiftieth anniversary of his birth.
- January 11 – President Carter announces the nomination of Gordon Vickery for Administrator of the United States Fire Administration.
- January 22 – President Carter announces the nomination of Stephen W. Bosworth for Ambassador Extraordinary and Plenipotentiary of the United States to the Republic of Tunisia.
- January 26 – President Carter holds his forty-third news conference in Room 450 of the Old Executive Office Building. President Carter answers questions from reporters on China and Taiwan, strategic arms limitation, Iran, federal judge selection, his potential re-election campaign, relations between the US and the Soviet Union, and minority education programs.
- January 27 – President Carter issues a statement on the death of Nelson Rockefeller who he credits with "helping to reassure the Nation with his own integrity and vigorous optimism."

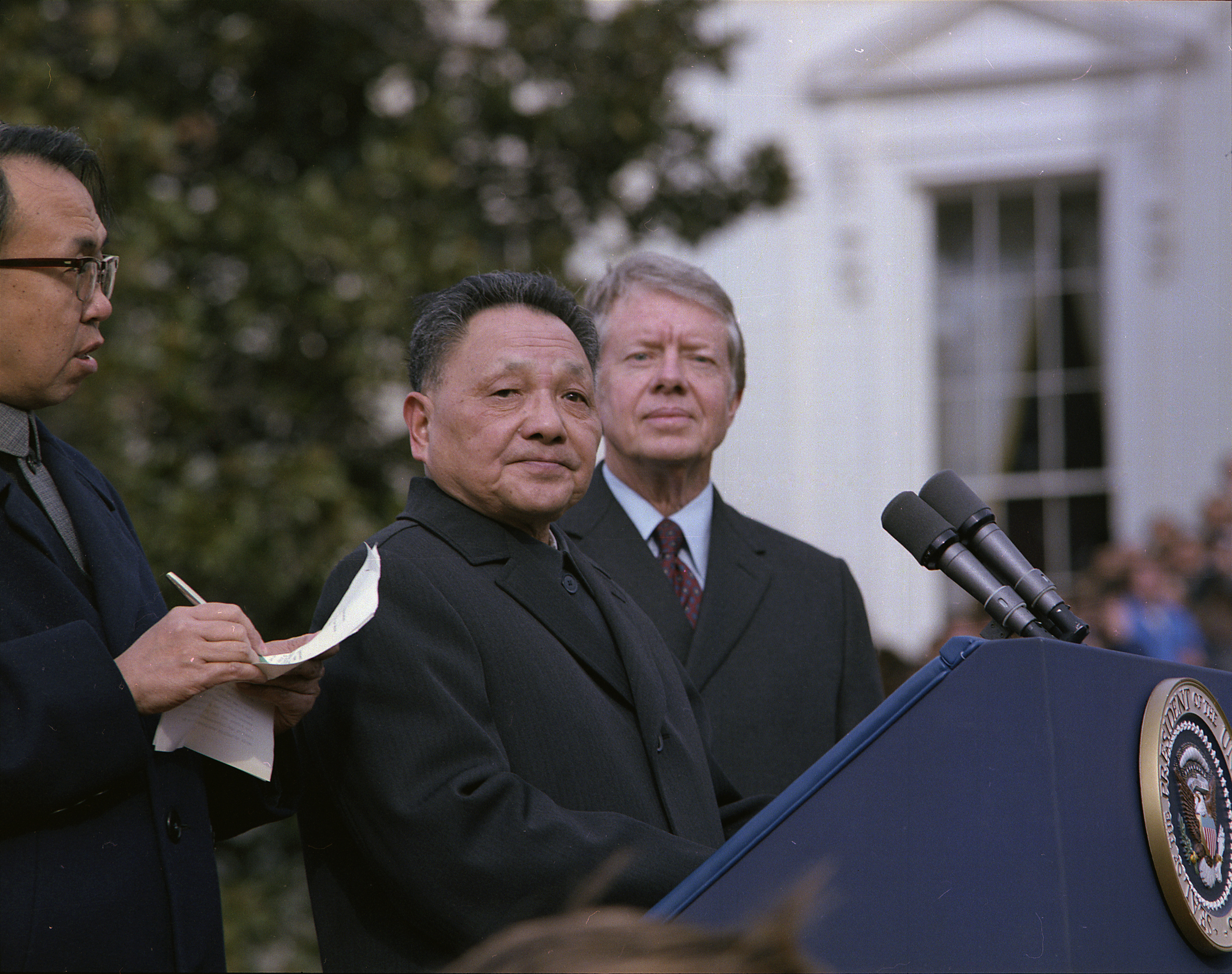
Deng Xiaoping and Jimmy Carter at the arrival ceremony for the Vice Premier of China, 29 January 1979

- January 29 – President Carter attends the welcoming ceremony for Chairman of the Chinese People's Political Consultative Conference Deng Xiaoping on the South Lawn.
- January 29 – In a letter to Speaker of the House of Representatives Tip O'Neill and chairman of the Senate Foreign Relations Committee Frank Church, President Carter submits a report "on progress made during the past 60 days toward the conclusion of a negotiated solution of the Cyprus problem."
- January 29 – President Carter attends a state dinner for Deng in the State Dining Room.
- January 29 – President Carter and Deng deliver remarks in the Opera House of the John F. Kennedy Center for the Performing Arts.
- January 30 – President Carter announces the nomination of Michael Kasha for membership on the National Science Board.
- January 30 – President Carter announces the nomination of Sidney A. Diamond for Assistant Commissioner of Patents and Trademarks.
- January 30 – President Carter announces the nominations of three individuals for membership on the National Commission on Libraries and Information Science.
- January 31 – In a message to Congress, President Carter reports "ten proposals to rescind a total of $914.6 million in budget authority previously provided by the Congress."
- January 31 – President Carter and Deng sign three exchange agreements in the East Room, providing Chinese consular offices in San Francisco and Houston in exchange for American consular offices in Shanghai and Canton, a joint commission on science and technology, and cultural exchanges in journalism, sports, arts, and humanities.
- January 31 – Energy Secretary Schlesinger says the Carter administration has to decide by April 1 on enforcing mandatory constraints on gas consumption and oil due to the oil imports halt from Iran.
- January 31 – In a vote of 11 to 2, the Senate Foreign Relations Committee votes to approve the nomination of George M. Seignious for Director of the Arms Control and Disarmament Agency.

== February ==
- February 1 – President Carter announces the appointment of Orville L. Freeman for membership on the Presidential Commission on World Hunger.
- February 1 – President Carter issues Proclamation 4636, designating March 1979 as "Red Cross Month".
- February 1 – President Carter issues a memorandum to agency heads instructing them on can be done by the federal government to address Red Cross Month.
- February 1 – President Carter announces the nominations of Richard R. Allen and George W. Camp for governors of the United States Postal Service.
- February 2 – President Carter announces the nomination of Joan M. Clark for Ambassador Extraordinary and Plenipotentiary of the United States to the Republic of Malta.
- February 2 – President Carter announces his according of Herbert F. York as ambassador while York heads the American delegation to the Comprehensive Test Ban Negotiations.
- February 2 – President Carter issues a memorandum directing agency and department leadership on what actions he recommends be taken to conserve energy.
- February 5 – President Carter announces the nomination of Loren E. Lawrence for Ambassador Extraordinary and Plenipotentiary of the United States to Jamaica.
- February 6 – President Carter announces the nomination of John P. Lewis for the rank of Minister amid his tenure as chairman of the Development Assistance Committee of the U.S. Mission to the Organization for Economic Cooperation and Development (OECD).
- February 8 – President Carter announces the nomination of A.D. Frazier, Jr. for membership on the National Council on the Humanities.
- February 8 – President Carter issues Proclamation 4638, designating the week of March 18 as "National Poison Prevention Week".

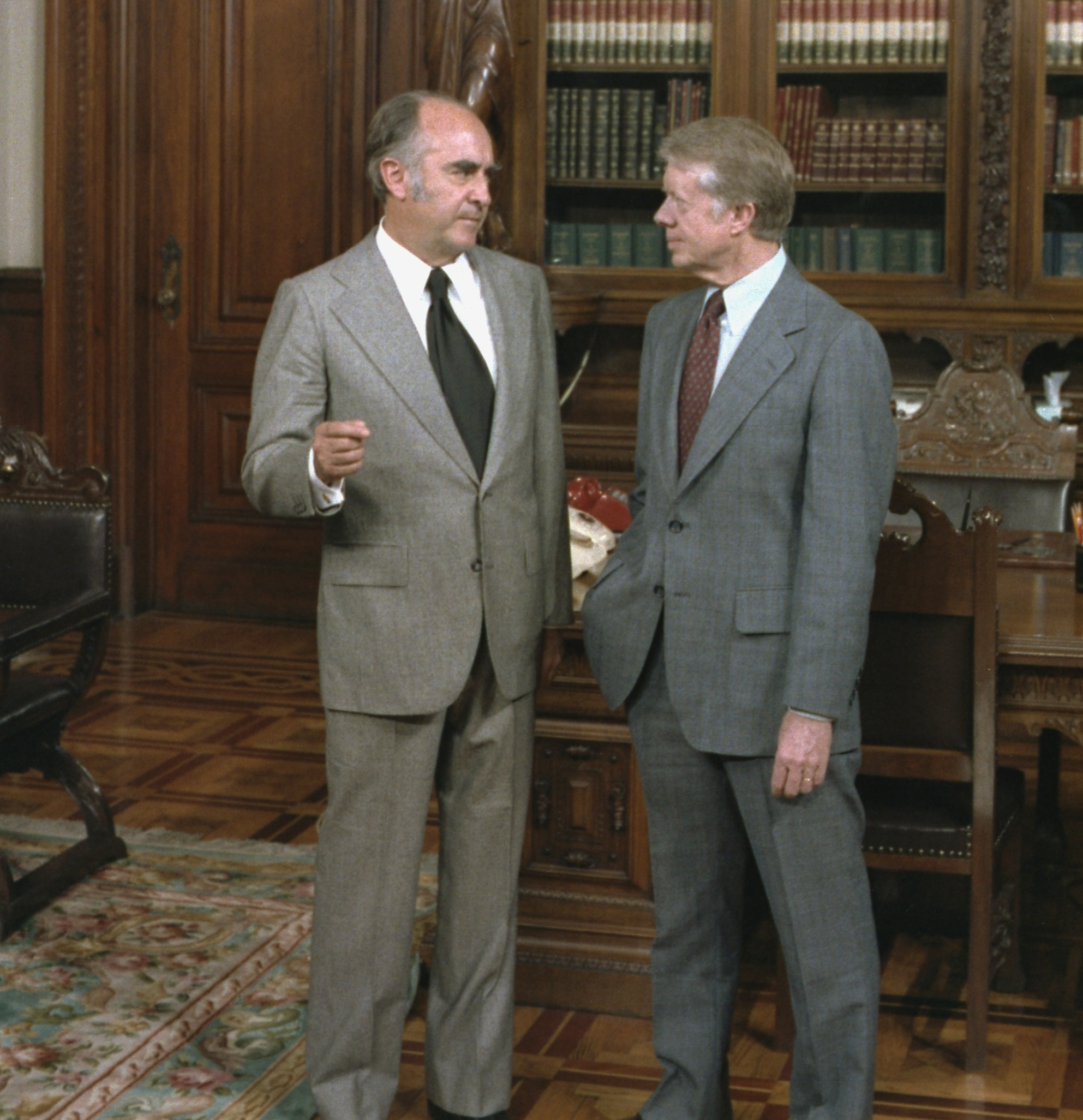
Mexican president José López Portillo (left) and U.S. President Jimmy Carter (right), 14 February 1979

- February 14 – President Carter announces the nomination of Jesse Hill, Jr. for membership on the board of directors of the Communications Satellite Corporation.
- February 14 – President Carter announces the appointments of members of the President's Commission on Pension Policy.
- February 14 – President Carter signs Executive Order 12120, ordering the US flag to be flown at half staff at all buildings, grounds, and naval vessels of the federal government in honor of Adolph Dubs.
- February 14 – President Carter and Mexican president José López Portillo deliver joint remarks at the welcoming ceremony for President Carter at Licenciado Benito Juarez International Airport.
- February 14 – President Carter attends a dinner in his honor in the Banquet Room at the Foreign Ministry Building.
- February 28 – President Carter announces the appointment of Bernard W. Rogers as Supreme Allied Commander by the Defense Planning Committee of the North Atlantic Council.
- February 28 – President Carter announces the nomination of Dick Clark for ambassador at large and United States coordinator for refugee affairs.
- February 28 – President Carter announces the nomination of June Gibbs Brown for Inspector General of the Interior Department.
- February 28 – President Carter announces the nomination of Charles L. Dempsey for Inspector General of the Department of Housing and Urban Development.
- February 28 – President Carter announces the nomination of Marjorie Fine Knowles for Inspector General of the Department of Labor.
- February 28 – President Carter announces the nomination of Thomas F. McBride for Inspector General of the Department of Agriculture.
- February 28 – President Carter announces the nomination of Allan L. Reynolds for Inspector General of the Veterans Administration.
- February 28 – President Carter signs Executive Order 12124, an amendment to the generalized system of preferences.
- February 28 – President Carter attends the swearing-in ceremony for the membership of the Small Business Conference Commission during an afternoon East Room ceremony.

== March ==
- March 1 – President Carter sends a message to Congress on the subject of the energy conservation contingency plans Emergency Weekend Gasoline Sales Restrictions, Emergency Building Temperature Restrictions, and Advertising Lighting Restrictions.
- March 1 – President Carter transmits a Standby Gasoline Rationing Plan to Congress in a message. He says the plan, if enacted alongside the three energy conservation contingency plans he submitted the same day, will "help mitigate the impact of a severe energy supply interruption."
- March 1 – President Carter meets with Israeli Prime Minister Begin in the former's office during the evening. The two agree afterward that their discussion was "a useful prelude to the extensive talks they will be having over the next days."
- March 2 – President Carter announces the nomination of James H. Duffy for Commissioner of the Postal Rate Commission.
- March 2 – President Carter issues a statement on the death of Senator Dewey Bartlett, who he credits with having "already established himself as a strong conservative voice in the Senate with an abiding concern for solving our Nation's energy problems" in spite of his Senate career being ended by his illness.
- March 2 – In a statement, President Carter notes that the following day will mark the 100th anniversary of the founding of the United States Geological Survey. President Carter mentions its origins and praises it with having provided "vital information upon which we make critical decisions and important national policy."
- March 2 – President Carter meets with Israel Prime Minister Begin in the Cabinet Room during the morning for "a serious, wide-ranging, and useful discussion of the situation in the region and the problems of building peace there."
- March 2 – President Carter announces the nomination of William M. Burkhalter for membership on the Renegotiation Board.
- March 3 – President Carter has lunch with Prime Minister of Canada Pierre Trudeau where the two discuss "international and bilateral issues concerning the economy" as well as energy and resolved to deep their collaborations. Carter and Trudeau make a joint appearance on the South Lawn during the afternoon.
- March 4 – President Carter meets with Israeli Prime Minister Begin for an hour and half with advisors. President Carter puts forward "suggestions designed to help resolve some of the outstanding differences between Egypt and Israel", which Begin states his intent to study these suggestions.
- March 5 – President Carter announces the nomination of Francis J. Meehan for Ambassador Extraordinary and Plenipotentiary of the United States to the Czechoslovak Socialist Republic.
- March 6 – President Carter submits the Hospital Cost Containment Act of 1979 to Congress in a message. He says the legislation is "one of the most critical anti-inflation" proposals ever considered by Congress.
- March 6 – President Carter issues Proclamation 4643, a designation of April 1979 as "Cancer Control Month".
- March 6 – In a statement, President Carter notes the upcoming March 14 will mark the centennial of the birth of Albert Einstein. Carter hails Einstein's achievements during life and his lasting legacy.
- March 6 – President Carter issues a memorandum to department and agency leadership regarding "Senior Executive Service Conversion Rights of Career Appointees to Presidential Appointments".
- March 7 – President Carter sends the sixteenth quarterly report of the Council on Wage and Price Stability to Congress in a message, containing a description of the Council's activities during 1978's third quarter.
- March 7 – President Carter issues a memorandum to department and agency leadership on the subject of the SES Pay Schedule.
- March 7 – Vice President of the United States Walter Mondale and President Carter deliver remarks on the latter's upcoming trip to Egypt and Israel on the South Lawn. Their remarks stress the significance of the trip and a desire by the administration to see a peaceful resolution to the Israeli–Palestinian conflict.
- March 7 – President Carter discusses U.S. economic policies affecting developing countries in a message to Congress. President Carter notes his proposal to create an International Development Cooperation Administration and states what purpose it would function in the event of its enactment and several other steps he has currently taken that he believes "will substantially strengthen the coordination of U.S. policies affecting the developing world, and will lead to a more coherent strategy of development and the more effective use of the various bilateral and multilateral instruments by which the U.S. can encourage the growth of developing economies."
- March 8 – President Carter announces the nomination of Lawrence Connell, Jr. for membership on the National Credit Union Administration Board.
- March 8 – President Carter announces the nomination of M. Athalie Range for membership on the board of directors of the National Railroad Passenger Corporation.
- March 8 – President Carter announces the nomination of Mary P. Bass for Inspector General of the Department of Commerce.
- March 8 – President Carter announces the nomination of Frank S. Sato for Inspector General of the Department of Transportation.
- March 8 – President Carter announces the nomination of Eldon D. Taylor for Inspector General of the National Aeronautics and Space Administration.
- March 8 – President Carter announces the nomination of Paul R. Boucher for Inspector General of the Small Business Administration.
- March 8 – President Carter announces the appointment of Lois K. Sharpe for membership on the Interstate Commission on the Potomac River Basin.
- March 14 – In a statement, President Carter says he has been informed by Israeli Prime Minister Begin that the Israeli Cabinet approved the two remaining proposals of their discussions, stating his satisfaction with their decision and the act "means that all of the outstanding issues in the negotiations between Egypt and Israel have now been successfully resolved."
- March 14 – In a letter to Arizona senator Dennis DeConcini, President Carter states his confidence in Energy Secretary Schlesinger while admitting the Energy Department can always be improved.
- March 15 – President Carter announces the appointment of Harold F. Cary for a U.S. Commissioner on the International Commission.
- March 16 – President Carter announces the nomination of Patricia A. Goldman for membership on the National Transportation Safety Board.
- March 16 – President Carter announces the appointment of Rebecca R. Polland for membership on the Board for International Food and Agricultural Development.
- March 16 – President Carter announces the nomination of Dale R. Babione for membership on the Committee for Purchase from the Blind and Other Severely Handicapped.
- March 20 – President Carter attends a White House reception for the Recording Industry Association of America in the East Room.
- March 21 – President Carter accepts the resignation of Administrator of General Services Joel Solomon in a letter, lauding his leadership with having caused "decades of waste and corruption at the GSA are now being exposed, and those who have betrayed the public trust are being identified and punished."
- March 21 – President Carter announces the appointment of nine individuals for membership on the President's Committee on the National Medal of Science.
- March 21 – In a statement, President Carter says the vote of the Israeli Knesset in approving the peace treaty between Israel and Egypt "affirms the deep and long-felt desire of the people of Israel for peace with their neighbors" and better relations between those two countries "will strengthen even more our relations with these two partners in peace and help move toward a stable, cooperative, and peaceful future for all the peoples of the Middle East."
- March 22 – President Carter transmits the Protocol Relating to an Amendment to the Convention on International Civil Aviation and the Protocol on the Authentic Quadrilingual Text of the Convention on International Civil Aviation to the Senate in a message.
- March 22 – President Carter transmits the Treaty of Extradition Between the United States of America and the United Mexican States to the Senate for ratification in a message.
- March 22 – President Carter announces the appointments of four individuals for membership on the Select Commission on Immigration and Refugee Policy.
- March 23 – President Carter issues memorandum on the subject of the 30th anniversary of the Joint Financial Management Improvement Program.
- March 23 – President Carter transmits the seventh annual report on the status of Federal advisory committees in a message to Congress.
- March 23 – President Carter announces the appointment of Richard W. Riley for membership on the Advisory Commission on Intergovernmental Relations.
- March 23 – President Carter announces the appointments of Harold J. Russell, Judith E. Heumann, and Robert G. Sampson for membership on the President's Committee on Employment of the Handicapped.
- March 23 – President Carter announces the membership on the Advisory Committee on the Arts.
- March 23 – President Carter announces the nomination of Rowland G. Freeman III for Administrator of the General Services Administration.
- March 24 – At Elk City High School gymnasium in Elk City, Oklahoma, President Carter delivers an address on administration policies and then answers questions from reporters on the peace treaty between Egypt and Israel, reinstatement of the draft, his religious beliefs, the Equal Rights Amendment, his Elk City farmers meeting, corporate profits, federal regulations, beef price controls, his views on the presidency, his role as peacemaker, voluntary wage guidelines, families with two incomes, abortion, utility bills, food stamp program, and the speed limit.
- March 25 – President Carter holds his forty-sixth news conference at the Dallas Convention Center. President Carter begins the conference with remarks on broadcasting, concluding that it will "bring to the entire world a truly historic sight" of prime ministers Begin and Sadat signing a peace treaty and answers questions from reporters on regulatory reforms, renewable energy sources, broadcast industry deregulation, First Amendment privileges, inflation, a peace treaty between Israel and Egypt, taxation of commercial broadcasters, and inflation.
- March 27 – President Carter announces the nomination of Janet L. Norwood for Commissioner of Labor Statistics at the Labor Department.
- March 27 – President Carter announces the nomination of H. Stephan Gordon for General Counsel of the Federal Labor Relations Authority.
- March 27 – President Carter announces the nomination of Lewis M. Branscomb for membership on the National Science Board.
- March 27 – President Carter transmits a message to Congress on the subject of science and technology.
- March 27 – President Carter attends the US-Egypt Business Council dinner honoring Egyptian president Sadat in the Hall of Flags at the headquarters of the Chamber of Commerce of the United States.
- March 28 – President Carter issues Proclamation 4650, a declaration of the week beginning on May 4, 1979, as "Asian/Pacific American Heritage Week."
- March 29 – President Carter issues Proclamation 4651, a designation of May 28, 1979, "as a day of prayer for permanent peace".
- March 29 – President Carter announces the nomination of Richard F. Celeste for director of the Peace Corps.
- March 30 – President Carter announces the nomination of Timothy F. Cleary for reappointment as a member and chairman of the Occupational Safety and Health Review Commission.
- March 31 – President Carter signs Executive Order 12127, forming the Federal Emergency Management Agency.
- March 31 – President Carter announces the appointment of Gordon Vickery for acting director of the Federal Emergency Management Agency.
- March 31 – President Carter issues a statement on the murder of Airey Neave.
- March 31 – President Carter attends a fundraising reception for David R. Obey in the Newman High School gymnasium in Wausau, Wisconsin.
- March 31 – President Carter delivers an address at the Milwaukee Performing Arts Center in Milwaukee, Wisconsin.
- March 31 – President Carter delivers an address at Wisconsin Democratic Party's Jefferson-Jackson Day Dinner in the East Hall of the Milwaukee Exposition Convention Center and Arena.

== April ==
- April 1 – President Carter delivers an address at the Middletown Townhall in Middletown, Pennsylvania.
- April 2 – President Carter announces the nomination of Robert P. Smith for Ambassador Extraordinary and Plenipotentiary of the United States to Liberia.
- April 2 – President Carter announces the nomination of William L. Swing for Ambassador Extraordinary and Plenipotentiary of the United States to the People's Republic of the Congo.
- April 2 – President Carter issues Proclamation 4652, a designation of the upcoming April 28 and April 29 as "Days of Remembrance of Victims of the Holocaust."
- April 2 – President Carter submits Reorganization Plan No. 1 of 1979 to Congress in a message. He says the plan will "create the Office of Federal Inspector for the Alaska Natural Gas Transportation System and establish the position of Federal Inspector."
- April 3 – President Carter announces the nomination of Read P. Dunn, Jr. for Commissioner of the Commodity Futures Trading Commission.
- April 4 – President Carter announces the appointment of Marilyn W. Black for membership on the Commission on Presidential Scholars.
- April 4 – President Carter transmits the Treaty of Extradition Between the United States of America and Japan to the Senate for ratification.
- April 4 – President Carter announces the appointment of Gloria C. Jimenez for acting associate director of the Federal Emergency Management Agency (FEMA).
- April 4 – President Carter announces the nomination of George C. Eads for membership on the Council of Economic Advisers.
- April 4 – President Carter transmits the National Public Works and Economic Development Act of 1979 to Congress in a message.
- April 4 – President Carter reports two budget authority deferrals that had totaled to 109.8 million.
- April 4 – President Carter delivers an address on hospital cost containment legislation to a group of civic and community leaders assembled in the East Room during a White House briefing.
- April 4 – President Carter issues Executive Order 12128, authorizing a representative of the Federal Labor Relations Authority "to participate in labor-relations decisions affecting Foreign Service employees".
- April 5 – President Carter announces the appointment of Fred J. Krumholtz for chairman of the Ohio River Basin Commission.
- April 5 – President Carter announces the withdrawal of the nomination of John P. Millhone for membership on the board of directors of the National Institute of Building Sciences. The request is made by Millhone after he had accepted a position as director of the Office of Buildings and Community Systems of the Conservation and Solar Applications Office at the Department of Energy following being nominated.
- April 5 – President Carter submits the Annual Report of the Corporation for Public Broadcasting for FY 1978 to Congress in a message. He lauds the corporation for once again having "prepared a thoughtful report which highlights its efforts for the past fiscal year" and articulating the accomplishments of public broadcasting.
- April 5 – President Carter delivers an evening address on the energy crisis from the Oval Office. President Carter says he will receive a report in 60 days "on ways to encourage greater use of coal" from the three federal agencies regulating the coal industry and states his intent to "set targets for our 50 States to reduce gasoline consumption and ask each State to meet its target"
- April 5 – President Carter signs Executive Order 12129, imposing the Director of the Office of Management and Budget to establish a Critical Energy Facility Program, "make recommendations to the President as to which nonnuclear facilities should be included in the Program", "provide for appropriate interagency mechanisms for the conduct of multiple agency reviews", "assist participating Executive agencies with the establishment of joint Federal and State and local agency reviews", "keep the President informed on agency performance in meeting scheduled decision deadlines", and "coordinate the procedures established herein with those procedures adopted by the Council on Environmental Quality pursuant to Executive Order No. 11991".
- April 6 – President Carter announces the nomination of Richard B. Lowe III for Deputy Inspector General at the Department of Health, Education, and Welfare.
- April 6 – President Carter signs Proclamation 4654, a proclamation of the week beginning on the upcoming May 20 as "World Trade Week" and requesting cooperation of all forms of government in observing that week.
- April 6 – President Carter signs Proclamation 4655, a revising of national policy on petroleum imports and petroleum products.
- April 6 – In a statement, President Carter declares "a regional energy emergency exists in the State of Florida of such severity that a temporary suspension of certain particulate and opacity control regulations which apply to fossil-fuel fired electric generating plants under the Florida Air Quality Implementation Plan may be necessary, and that other means of responding to the energy emergency may be inadequate."
- April 7 – President Carter attends the Virginia Democratic Party's Jefferson-Jackson Day Dinner in the Virginia Room in Richmond, Virginia.
- April 9 – In a letter to Speaker O'Neill, President Carter sends a bill that if enacted would "authorize supplemental international security assistance for the fiscal year 1979 in support of the peace treaty between Egypt and Israel and related agreements".
- April 10 – President Carter signs the Taiwan Relations Act into law. President Carter says the legislation will "enable the American people and the people on Taiwan to maintain commercial, cultural, and other relations without official Government representation and without diplomatic relations."
- April 25 – President Carter attends the Annual Convention of the American Newspaper Publishers Association in the Grand Ballroom at the Waldorf Astoria Hotel in New York City, New York.
- April 25 – President Carter delivers an address on administration policies and then answers questions on amendments to the Clean Water Act, safety in nuclear power plants, negotiations for peace in the Middle East, inflation, gasoline and oil supplies, nuclear power plant safety, interest rates, impact and funding, education programs, federal mortgage programs, his daughter Amy, the proposal for an Education Department, federal aid for college students, space technology, and nuclear power plants at Portsmouth Senior High School auditorium in Portsmouth, New Hampshire.
- April 25 – President Carter attends a reception for Governor Hugh Gallen in the Memorial High School gymnasium in Manchester, New Hampshire.
- April 25 – President Carter attends a Democratic Party fundraising dinner in the Sheraton Wayfarer Hotel Convention Center in Bedford, New Hampshire.
- April 27 – President Carter issues a memorandum to department and agency leadership on the subject of the Interdepartmental Committee on Domestic Violence. In response to the three to six million acts of violence committed in American homes, Carter says he is "asking the Secretary of Health, Education, and Welfare to chair an Interdepartmental Committee on Domestic Violence to coordinate a review of federal programs which currently provide or could provide assistance to victims of domestic violence, and to formulate a work plan by June 15 to guide our future actions. Please designate a policy-level member of your department or agency to serve as a member of this committee with Secretary Califano."
- April 27 – President Carter announces the nominations of John Hope Franklin, Lewis Manilow, Olin C. Robison, Neil C. Sherburne, Leonard L. Silverstein, and Mae Sue Talley for membership on the United States Advisory Commission on International Communication, Cultural and Educational Affairs.
- April 27 – President Carter announces the appointments of Pastora San Juan Cafferty and Walter J. Leonard as members of the board of visitors to the United States Naval Academy.
- April 27 – In a statement, President Carter says the House Science and Technology committee vote to continue construction of the liquid metal fast breeder nuclear reactor at Clinch River "was a significant setback to a rational and responsible nuclear energy policy."
- April 27 – President Carter commutes the sentences of Valdik Enger and Rudolf Chernyayev in accordance with arrangements worked out by the US and Soviet Union governments.
- April 28 – President Carter attends the annual dinner for the National Association for Equal Opportunity in Higher Education in the Crystal Ballroom at. the Washington Hilton Hotel.
- April 28 – President Carter attends the White House Correspondents Dinner in the International Ballroom at the Washington Hilton Hotel.
- April 30 – President Carter announces the appointment of Helen Meyer for membership on the Advisory Committee of the White House Conference on Library and Information Services.
- April 30 – President Carter announces the appointment of Paul J. Mishkin for membership on the Permanent Committee for the Oliver Wendell Holmes Devise.
- April 30 – President Carter issues Proclamation 4659, requesting June 17, 1979, be observed as "Father's Day".
- April 30 – President Carter holds his forty-eighth news conference in Room 450 of the Old Executive Office Building. President Carter begins the conference with an address on congressional action over the standby gasoline rationing plan and answers questions from reporters on oil price decontrol, U.S. trade with the Soviet Union and China, strategic arms limitation, soviet dissidents, James Fallows, price and wage guidelines, windfall profits tax, energy, food, and housing prices, Israeli settlement policy, and Rhodesia.
- April 30 – In a statement, President Carter expresses satisfaction with the Senate vote on the Education Department which he says will "bring tighter management" to over 100 federal programs, end the current "bureaucratic duplication necessitated by the current organizational structure", cut redtape for those dealing with federal education programs, and "make one Cabinet official responsible full-time for the effective, economical management of programs which cost the American taxpayer $13 billion annually."

== May ==
- May 1 – In conformity with Section 4 of Public Law 94-110, President Carter transmits the seventh report of the United States Sinai Support Mission to Congress in a message.
- May 1 – President Carter announces the nomination of Thomas E. Harris and Frank P. Reiche for membership on the Federal Election Commission.
- May 1 – President Carter attends a White House reception in the East Room.
- May 1 – President Carter transmits regulations pertaining to the personnel system of the Agency for International Development to Congress in a message.
- May 2 – President Carter attends a welcoming ceremony for Prime Minister of Japan Masayoshi Ohira on the South Lawn.
- May 3 – President Carter announces the John W. Macy, Jr. for director of the Federal Emergency Management Agency (FEMA).
- May 3 – President Carter announces the appointment of Phyllis R. Spielman for membership on the Advisory Committee to the Pension Benefit Guaranty Corporation.
- May 3 – President Carter announces the appointment of Jay P. Altmayer for membership on the Committee for the Preservation of the White House.
- May 3 – Senator Abraham Ribicoff announces he will not seek a fourth term. President Carter releases a statement responding to the retirement announcement, lauding Ribicoff for having "compiled a distinguished career of public service that can serve as a model of decency, compassion, and ability" and crediting him with having "helped to pave the way for peace between Israel and Egypt."
- May 4 – President Carter announces the nomination of Luther H. Hodges, Jr. for Under Secretary of Commerce.
- May 4 – President Carter announces the nomination of Frank V. Ortiz, Jr. for Ambassador Extraordinary and Plenipotentiary of the United States to Guatemala.
- May 4 – President Carter announces the nomination of William M. Landau for membership on the board of directors of the Overseas Private Investment Corporation.
- May 4 – President Carter announces the nomination of Leon B. Applewhaite for membership on the Federal Labor Relations Authority.
- May 4 – President Carter signs Executive Order 12131, extending the membership of the President's Export Council.
- May 4 – President Carter delivers an address on domestic issues such as inflation, the oil industry, American purchases of Mexico exports, gasohol, wood products, and natural gas extracting to the Iowa State Association of Counties in the Grand Ballroom at the Airport Hilton Inn in Des Moines, Iowa.
- May 4 – President Carter holds his forty-ninth news conference in the Lower Monterey Room at the Des Moines Hyatt House. President Carter begins the conference with an address in opposition to congressional approval of the Clinch River breeder reactor and answers questions from reporters on inflation, energy conservation, American prisoners in Israel, his candidacy in the 1980 Presidential election, nuclear power, gasohol, gasoline shortages, a wood-burning stove for the White House, oil price controls, exchanges of agricultural products for oil, oil company profits, and fuel supplies for agriculture.
- May 4 – President Carter attends a reception for the Iowa Democratic Party in Monterey Rooms 3 and 4 at the Des Moines Hyatt House in Des Moines. President Carter delivers remarks on the ratification of SALT, a national American energy policy, and farm income.
- May 4 – President Carter attends a memorial tribute for assassinated Mayor of San Francisco George Moscone at the War Memorial Opera House in San Francisco, California.
- May 5 – In a statement, President Carter notes the possible causes for the gasoline shortage in California and states his directing "Secretary Schlesinger to immediately determine the facts of this situation, in consultation with State and local government and private leaders" and "the Department of Energy to move immediately to ensure that recent changes in the allocation program to provide additional gasoline to high-use areas, such as southern California, are strictly enforced." Carter requests that Californians resist urges to retain full takes at all times, citing this as only increasing the issue amid "a great need to avoid all nonessential use of gasoline."
- May 5 – President Carter attends the dedication ceremony of the Placita de Dolores in Los Angeles, California.
- May 7 – President Carter transmits an amendment to the Standby Gasoline Rationing Plan to Congress in a message. Carter says the enactment of the amendment will provide each state "an expanded State Ration Reserve of eight percent not only to provide for the needs of the handicapped and hardship applicants as already provided in the plan, but to provide additional flexibility to the states in dispensing supplemental ration allotments to citizens with special needs."
- May 7 – President Carter transmits the seventeenth quarterly report of the Council on Wage and Price Stability in a message to Congress. The report is said to contain information on the activities of the Council during 1978's fourth quarter "in monitoring both prices and wages in the private sector and various Federal Government activities that may lead to higher costs and prices without creating commensurate benefits" as well as the Council's discussions on "reports, analyses, and filings before Federal regulatory agencies and the Council's role in the anti-inflation program."
- May 7 – President Carter announces the membership of the U.S. delegation to the 32d World Health Assembly of the World Health Organization.
- May 7 – President Carter transmits the second National Energy Plan to Congress in a message. President Carter reflects on the first National Energy Plan he unveiled as well as the steps he mentioned during his latest energy address to the nation and how the second plan "shows how these programs relate to our overall energy problem, and to the other policies and programs which we must carry forward."
- May 7 – President Carter issues a memorandum to the Administrator of the Environmental Protection Agency on his view that a regional energy emergency exists in the State of Florida, advocating for "a temporary suspension of certain particulate and opacity control regulations which apply to fossil-fuel fired electric generating plants under the Florida Air Quality Implementation Plan be necessary, and that other means of responding to the energy emergency may be inadequate, I hereby extend that determination from May 5 to June 4, 1979."
- May 8 – President Carter signs Proclamation 4660, designating the week starting on the upcoming June 10 "as National Flag Week" and calling for government officials to adhere to this proclamation by displaying the flag on all government buildings throughout the week.
- May 8 – President Carter announces the nomination of Alfred L. Atherton, Jr. for Ambassador Extraordinary and Plenipotentiary of the United States to the Arab Republic of Egypt.
- May 8 – President Carter announces the nomination of Arthur L. Nims III as Judge of the U.S. Tax Court.
- May 8 – President Carter submits an amendment to the Standby Gasoline Rationing Plan to Congress in a message, which he says will provide each state "with an expanded State Ration Reserve of eight percent not only to provide for the needs of the handicapped and hardship applicants as already provided in the plan, but to provide additional flexibility to the states in dispensing supplemental ration allotments to citizens with special needs."
- May 9 – President Carter transmits the Convention between the Government of the United States of America and the Government of the Hungarian People's Republic for the Avoidance of Double Taxation and the Prevention of Fiscal Evasion to the Senate for ratification in a message.
- May 9 – President Carter transmits the Treaty of Friendship between the United States of America and Tuvalu to the Senate for ratification in a message, which he writes "will further United States foreign policy interest in promoting peace, security and development of the region and assure nondiscriminatory access to the region by the United States fishing fleet and other vessels contributing to the American Samoan economy."
- May 9 – In a statement, President Carter applauds the Senate for their approval of the Standby Gasoline Rationing Plan, which he says "creates a national ration reserve to deal with critical national emergencies", and calls on the House to copy the Senate by placing "the national interest above narrower interests".
- May 23 – President Carter announces the appointment of John C. Rouillard for membership on the National Advisory Council on Indian Education.
- May 23 – President Carter participates in a question and answer session with the National Cable Television Association from the Map Room of the White House, beginning with an address on national goals and answering questions on strategic arms limitations, inflation, and energy.
- May 23 – President Carter submits the Social Welfare Reform Amendments of 1979 and the Work and Training Opportunities Act of 1979 to Congress in a message as part of his welfare reform program. He insists that the enactment of both programs "will be an important step in addressing the key failings of the present welfare system-promoting efficiency, improving incentives and opportunities to work, and substantially improving the incomes of millions of poor people."
- May 23 – President Carter signs Executive Order 12139, authorizing the Attorney General "to approve electronic surveillance to acquire foreign intelligence information without a court order, but only if the Attorney General makes the certifications required by that Section" and "approve applications to the court having jurisdiction under Section 103 of that Act to obtain orders for electronic surveillance for the purpose of obtaining foreign intelligence information." It also serves an amendment to Executive Order 12036.
- May 23 – In a statement, President Carter notes the importance of the hearings on sunset legislation by the House Rules Committee and he says leading sunset bill H.R. 2 "will double the proportion of the Federal budget that is subject to periodic review" and "ensure that we take a hard look at most Federal programs at least once a decade."
- May 24 – President Carter announces the appointments of 27 individuals for membership on the President's Export Council.
- May 24 – President Carter attends the swearing-in ceremony for the chairman and membership of the President's Export Council during a Roosevelt Room ceremony.
- May 24 – President Carter announces his decision to send a team of top officials from several federal agencies on a trip to Kansas City the following day for meetings with Midwestern Governors and their representatives regarding diesel fuel shortage problems.
- May 24 – In a statement, President Carter says Congress, through its approval of the first budget resolution, "has joined the administration in recognizing the urgency of fiscal restraint, while still providing for critical national needs. I congratulate the Congress and, in particular, Chairmen Muskie and Giaimo, who guided the resolution through their respective Houses."
- May 25 – President Carter announces the appointments of nine individuals for membership on the National Commission on Employment Policy.
- May 25 – President Carter attends the spring meeting of the Democratic National Committee in the Park Ballroom at the Sheraton-Park Hotel, delivering an address on the history of the Democratic Party and answers questions on the accomplishments of his administration, oil price decontrols, and the 1980 Democratic National Convention.
- May 25 – President Carter announces the nomination of John Mark Deutch for Under Secretary of Energy.
- May 26 – President Carter signs S. 631 into law. The bill authorizes "the presentation of a specially struck gold medal to John Wayne."
- May 29 – President Carter issues a statement on the death of U.S. District Judge John II. Wood, Jr., calling his assassination "an assault on our very system of justice."
- May 29 – President Carter holds his fiftieth news conference in Room 450 of the Old Executive Office Building. President Carter delivers an address on Executive Order 12140 along with production of oil and answers questions from reporters on oil supplies and prices, tax reductions, wage and price guidelines, his leadership responsibility, relations with Congress, the organization of petroleum exporting countries, his fishing trips, Rhodesia, Soviet dissidents and their families being released, his support within the Democratic Party, strategic arms and the MX missile, the Middle East, and Bert Lance.
- May 29 – President Carter signs Executive Order 12140, granting American governors "the authority to establish a system of end-user allocation for motor gasoline, subject to the terms and conditions as set forth below" and supply gasoline to vehicles meeting a set of prerequisites.
- May 29 – President Carter attends the 30th Annual Brotherhood Citation dinner of the National Conference of Christians and Jews in the International Ballroom at the Washington Hilton Hotel.
- May 30 – President Carter attends a White House reception for Vietnam Veterans Week in the East Room.
- May 30 – President Carter issues a memorandum to department and agency leadership regarding the Economic Policy Group as well as coordination in economic policy-making, stating which procedures that will be implemented immediately in order to "assure efficient coordination of economic policymaking".
- May 31 – President Carter announces the nomination of Alan A. Parker for an Assistant Attorney General.
- May 31 – President Carter announces the nomination of Maurice Rosenberg for an Assistant Attorney General.
- May 31 – President Carter announces the nomination of 19 public members and 6 Government representatives to the President's Commission on Executive Exchange.

== June ==
- June 1 – President Carter transmits his recommendation on the authority to waive subsections (a) and (b) of section 402 of the Trade Act of 1974 be extended for a further period of twelve months in a message to Congress.
- June 1 – President Carter issues a memorandum to the secretary of state on the subject of trade with Romania and Hungary.
- June 1 – President Carter announces the nomination of James Keough Bishop for Ambassador Extraordinary and Plenipotentiary of the United States to the Republic of Niger.
- June 1 – President Carter announces the appointment of Sally Angela Shelton as United States special representative to the States of Antigua, Saint Christopher-Nevis-Anguilla, and Saint Vincent.
- June 1 – President Carter announces the nomination of Daniel Marcus for General Counsel of the Department of Agriculture.
- June 1 – President Carter announces the nomination of Truman A. Morrison III to the vacancy on the District of Columbia Superior Court.
- June 1 – President Carter announces the nomination of Vincent P. Barabba for director of the Bureau of the Census.
- June 1 – President Carter announces the nomination of Andrew A. DiPrete for membership on the Federal Home Loan Bank Board.
- June 2 – President Carter delivers an address on the role Indiana played in his election to the presidency and the SALT treaty to dinner guests in Convention Hall C at the Indianapolis Convention Center in Indianapolis, Indiana.
- June 2 – President Carter attends the Jefferson-Jackson Day Dinner of the Indiana Democratic Party in Convention Hall B at the Indianapolis Convention Center.
- June 3 – President Carter attends a memorial service for A. Philip Randolph at the Metropolitan African Methodist Episcopal Church.
- June 4 – In a letter to Speaker O'Neill and Chairman of the Senate Foreign Relations Committee Church, Carter submits a report "on progress made during the past sixty days toward the conclusion of a negotiated solution of the Cyprus problem."
- June 4 – President Carter issues Proclamation 4664, a designation of July 18 as "National P.O.W.-M.I.A. Recognition Day".
- June 5 – President Carter issues Executive Order 12141, an attempt to provide "an orderly implementation of the independent review of Federal water resource programs and projects".
- June 5 – President Carter announces the nomination of Walter J. McDonald for Assistant Secretary of the Treasury.
- June 5 – President Carter announces the nomination of Richard I. Beattie for General Counsel of the Department of Health, Education, and Welfare.
- June 5 – President Carter announces the nomination of Michael R. Kelley for membership on the board of directors of the Corporation for Public Broadcasting.
- June 5 – President Carter announces the appointment of four individuals for Commissioners of the United States Section of the International North Pacific Fisheries Commission.
- June 6 – President Carter submits legislation intended reform the Federal civilian employee compensation system to Congress in a message, saying the proposals "will insure that Federal employees are rewarded fairly for their work and that taxpayers' dollars for such compensation are well spent" while being part of his "continuing efforts to make the operation of the Federal government more efficient, effective and equitable."
- June 6 – President Carter and Chancellor of Germany Helmut Schmidt meet for discussions on the Tokyo summit and energy crisis, agreeing on the importance of the SALT II agreement for both the US and Europe.
- June 6 – President Carter and Chancellor Schmidt make a joint public appearance on the South Grounds.
- June 6 – President Carter announces the nomination of G. H. Patrick Bursley for membership on the National Transportation Safety Board.
- June 6 – President Carter announces the appointment of seven individuals for public membership on the National Alcohol Fuels Commission.
- June 7 – President Carter approves the development of the MX missile.
- June 7 – President Carter addresses the founding convention of the United Food and Commercial Workers International Union in the Sheraton-Park Ballroom at the Sheraton-Park Hotel. His address includes a national health program and the SALT treaty.
- June 7 – President Carter announces the United States will not be lifting Zimbabwe-Rhodesian sanctions, saying it is not in the best interest of the US or the people of Zimbabwe-Rhodesia.
- June 7 – President Carter attends a White House dinner honoring the Black Music Association on the South Grounds.
- June 8 – Deputy Press Secretary Rex Granum announces President Carter has determined the US will pursue a full-scale MX and that "the decision will continue the longstanding U.S. policy of maintaining a triad of three survivable strategic force components: intercontinental ballistic missiles, submarine-launched ballistic missiles, and heavy bombers."
- June 8 – President Carter announces the nomination of John T. Rhett for Federal Inspector for the Alaska Natural Gas Transportation System.
- June 11 – President Carter announces the nomination of Tyrone Brown for reappointment to membership on the Federal Communications Commission.
- June 11 – President Carter announces the nomination of John R. Evans for reappointment to membership on the Securities and Exchange Commission.
- June 11 – President Carter announced the appointment of four individuals for membership on the National Advisory Council on Extension and Continuing Education.
- June 11 – President Carter meets with Vice President of Egypt Husni Mubarak in the Oval Office for a review of the status of cooperation between Egypt and the United States in various areas.
- June 12 – President Carter announces his proposal to Congress of a national health plan which he says "will meet the most urgent needs in health care of the American people in a practical, cost-efficient, and fiscally responsible manner" through providing millions of Americans with health care and protecting them against costs for illnesses.
- June 12 – President Carter issues a statement on the death of John Wayne, who he calls "a symbol of many of the most basic qualities that made America great. The ruggedness, the tough independence, the sense of personal conviction and courage—on and off the screen—reflected the best of our national character."
- June 12 – President Carter issues a memorandum for the Administrator of the Environmental Protection Agency declaring "a regional energy emergency no longer exists in Florida".
- June 12 – President Carter announces the appointments of two individuals for membership of the Advisory Commission on Intergovernmental Relations.
- June 12 – President Carter announces the appointments of three individuals for membership of the Commission on Presidential Scholars.
- June 13 – In a letter to Speaker O'Neill and President of the Senate Mondale, President Carter transmits legislation to form "a comprehensive program with the financial responsibility shared by Federal, State and local governments as well as industry" that is said to establish "a comprehensive and uniform system of notification, emergency response, enforcement, liability and limited economic compensation for such incidents."
- June 13 – President Carter signs S. 613 into law, "authorizing that a special gold medal be struck in recognition of Hubert Humphrey's distinguished career".
- June 13 – President Carter announces the nomination of John Howard Moxley III for Assistant Secretary of Defense.
- June 13 – President Carter announces the nomination of Samuel B. Nemirow for Assistant Secretary of Commerce for Maritime Affairs.
- June 13 – President Carter announces the nomination of Jean McKee for membership on the United States Advisory Commission on International Communication, Cultural and Educational Affairs.
- June 14 – President Carter delivers an address on the summit in Vienna and SALT II treaty on the South Lawn.
- June 14 – President Carter signs Veterans' Health Care Amendments of 1979 into law. President Carter says the legislation will enable the United States Department of Veterans Affairs "provide special readjustment counseling for Vietnam era veterans and their families" and "establish a 5-year pilot program for the treatment and rehabilitation of veterans with alcohol or drug dependence or abuse problems."
- June 14 – President Carter announces the nomination of Anne Clark Martindell for Ambassador Extraordinary and Plenipotentiary of the United States to New Zealand and to Western Samoa.
- June 14 – President Carter announces the nomination of Louis F. Moret for director of the Office of Minority Economic Impact at the Energy Department.
- June 14 – President Carter announces the nomination of Stuart M. Statler for Commissioner of the Consumer Product Safety Commission.
- June 14 – President Carter announces the nomination of P. A. Mack, Jr. for membership on the National Credit Union Administration Board.
- June 14 – President Carter announces the nomination of Frankie M. Freeman for Inspector General of the Community Services Administration.
- June 15 – President Carter announces the nomination of Charles J. Chamberlain for reappointment for membership on the Railroad Retirement Board.
- June 18 – President Carter delivers an address to a joint session of Congress at the Vienna Summit in the House Chamber of the Capitol. The remarks primarily endorse the ratification of SALT II and the effect it will have on relations between the United States and Soviet Union.
- June 19 – President Carter transmits the Trade Agreements Act of 1979 to Congress in a message. President Carter endorses the legislation as implementing "domestic law as required or appropriate to implement the Geneva agreements, and fulfill our international commitment" as well as offering opportunities to Americans through involvement with the international community.
- June 20 – During a dedication ceremony, President Carter announces his intention to send Congress "legislative recommendations for a new solar strategy that will move our Nation toward true energy security and abundant, readily available energy supplies."
- June 26 – President Carter answers questions from reporters on refugees, discussions he may have had on relations between the United States and the Soviet Union, Japanese concern over American presence in North Asia and other Asian countries, and the upcoming summit meeting outside the American ambassador's residence in Tokyo.
- June 26 – President Carter attends a reception with members of the Japanese diet at the residence of Hirokichi Nada in Tokyo.
- June 30 – President Carter delivers remarks at Robertson Memorial Field on the role the Signal Corps plays to the executive branch and reflects on his own military career.

== July ==
- July 1 – President Carter delivers remarks at a reception in the Officer's Club of Hickam Air Force Base in Hawaii.
- July 2 – President Carter announces the nominations of six public members and five Government members on the board of directors of the National Consumer Cooperative Bank.
- July 3 – President Carter announces the nomination of Jane McGrew for General Counsel of the Department of Housing and Urban Development.
- July 5 – White House Press Secretary Jody Powell announces President Carter "intends to propose at an early date a series of strong measures to restrain United States demand for imported oil" and "is in the process of assessing major domestic issues which he believes are important to the country and which include, but go beyond, the question of energy."
- July 6 – President Carter issues a memorandum to the Administrator of the Environmental Protection Agency on the subject of Florida energy emergency.
- July 9 – President Carter says he has "received a personal commitment from Crown Prince Fahd of Saudi Arabia to increase substantially crude oil production for a significant and specific period of time" while speaking to members of Congress at Camp David.
- July 10 – President Carter announces the appointment of Abbi Fisher for membership on the President's Council on Physical Fitness and Sports.
- July 10 – President Carter issues a statement on the death of Arthur Fiedler, who he credits with introducing "millions to the infinite variety and pleasures of music."
- July 10 – President Carter sends a message to Congress on the subject of the national energy supply shortage.
- July 11 – President Carter announces the nomination of Harvey J. Feldman for Ambassador Extraordinary and Plenipotentiary of the United States to Papua New Guinea and to the Solomon Islands.
- July 11 – President Carter issues Proclamation 4665, "an extension for the period of June 14, 1979 through February 13, 1980, of the temporary quantitative limitations imposed by Proclamation 4445".
- July 11 – In a statement, President Carter says the House approval of the Education Department legislation "will streamline administration of more than 150 Federal education programs, saving tax dollars and cutting redtape" as well as cause better management for health and human services programs by the federal government.
- July 16 – President Carter attends the Annual Convention of the National Association of Counties in the H. Roe Bartle Convention Center ballroom in Kansas City, Missouri.
- July 17 – President Carter announces the nomination of William P. Hobgood for Assistant Secretary of Labor for labor-management relations.
- July 23 – President Carter announces the nomination of James W. Spain for Deputy Representative of the United States to the United Nations.
- July 23 – President Carter announces the nomination of Harold Alonza Black for membership on the National Credit Union Administration Board.
- July 24 – President Carter submits a 6.2 million deferral in budget authority for the Bureau of Prisons in the Department of Justice to Congress in a message.
- July 24 – President Carter announces the nomination of Robert Joseph Brown for membership on the National Mediation Board.
- July 25 – President Carter announces the nomination of William D. Wolle for Ambassador Extraordinary and Plenipotentiary of the United States to the United Arab Emirates.
- July 25 – President Carter announces the nomination of Paul A. Volcker for chairman of the Federal Reserve Board.
- July 25 – Press Secretary Jody Powell says President Carter has requested "Hedley Donovan to serve as a Senior Adviser to the President", a request that Donovan is confirmed to have accepted.
- July 25 – In a letter to Speaker O'Neill and Senate Foreign Relations Committee Chairman Church, President Carter submits a "report on progress made during the past sixty days toward the conclusion of a negotiated solution of the Cyprus problem."
- July 25 – President Carter announces the nomination of Ronald P. Wertheim for membership on the Merit Systems Protection Board.
- July 25 – President Carter holds his fifty-first news conference in the East Room, beginning the conference with an address on notional goals of his administration such as American energy security, and answers questions from reporters on the federal budget, changes to his cabinet as well as his potential re-election campaign, his health, the selection of Charles Duncan as energy secretary, Hamilton Jordan, relations with the news media, the value of the dollar, Nicaragua, the US economy, the windfall profits tax, his support of United States Secretary of Housing and Urban Development Patricia Roberts Harris, and the House of Representatives' amending of a standby rationing plan bill earlier in the day.
- July 26 – President Carter signs the Trade Agreements Act of 1979 into law during a morning ceremony in the Rose Garden. President Carter says the legislation "strengthens and solidifies America's position in the international trade community" through its revising the rules of international trade for what he calls "a fairer and more equitable and more open environment for world trade."
- July 27 – President Carter transmits the text of the proposed Agreement Between the United States and Australia Concerning Peaceful Uses of Nuclear Energy in a message to Congress.
- July 27 – President Carter announces the nomination of Moon Landrieu for Secretary of Housing and Urban Development.
- July 27 – In a letter to Speaker O'Neill and President of the Senate Mondale, Carter transmits legislation for a proposed Solar Energy Development Bank which he says if enacted "provides for incentives which can, in conjunction with other governmental actions to be undertaken as part of the Administration's program, stimulate the installation of solar energy systems in residential and commercial properties on a significant scale."
- July 27 – President Carter announces the nomination of Neil Goldschmidt for United States Secretary of Transportation.
- July 27 – President Carter announces the nomination of William A. Clement, Jr. and Graciela Olivarez for membership on the board of directors of the National Consumer Cooperative Bank.
- July 31 – President Carter announces his nomination of Jay Janis for membership on the Federal Home Loan Bank Board.
- July 31 – President Carter delivers remarks outside the Cane Run facility in Louisville, Kentucky on energy security legislation and the current developments pertaining to it potentially being passed.
- July 31 – In the Bardstown High School gymnasium in Bardstown, Kentucky, President Carter delivers remarks on the subject of the energy crisis and answers questions on standby gasoline rationing plan, telephone service, volunteer armed forces, the Education Department, oil industry rights, goals of his administration, coal and the environment, regulatory reform, Indochina refugees, American foreign policy, health programs, strategic arms limitation, and hazardous waste disposal.

== September ==
- September 3 – President Carter attends a Labor Day White House picnic on the South Lawn.
- September 4 – President Carter issues Executive Order 12154, placing several positions are placed in level IV of the Executive Schedule.
- September 6 – President Carter issues Proclamation 4679, designating the first Sunday following Labor Day as "National Grandparents Day".
- September 6 – President Carter commutes the sentences of Oscar Collazo, Rafael Cancel Miranda, Irving Flores Rodriguez, and Lolita Lebron.
- September 6 – President Carter attends a reception for the World Conference on Religion and Peace in the East Room.
- September 12 – President Carter announces his low income energy assistance program which he says if enacted "would provide $1.6 billion in aid this winter, and $2.4 billion per year thereafter" as well as address the need of "alleviating the impact of higher energy prices on those who are suffering most from higher energy prices."
- September 12 – President Carter makes an appearance at the Steubenville High School auditorium in Steubenville, Ohio. President Carter begins with an address on administration policies relating to the steel industry, and answers questions on energy prices, fuel supplies, energy programs, coal supplies, employment in the coal industry, nuclear energy, coal and environmental standards, coal production, renewable energy supplies, and energy efficient automobiles.
- September 12 – President Carter announces the nomination of George M. Fumich, Jr. for Assistant Secretary of Energy for Fossil Energy.
- September 12 – President Carter announces the nomination of Ruth M. Davis for Assistant Secretary of Energy for Resource Applications.
- September 12 – President Carter announces the nomination of John C. Sawhill for Deputy Secretary of Energy.
- September 12 – President Carter announces the nomination of William Walker Lewis for Assistant Secretary of Energy for Policy and Evaluation.
- September 27 – President Carter reports four new deferrals of budget authority of $861.9 million as well as a revision to deferral that had been transmitted earlier, increasing the amount deferred by $3.8 million, in a message to Congress.
- September 27 – President Carter delivers remarks on receiving the final report from the President's Commission on the Holocaust at the Rose Garden ceremony.
- September 27 – President Carter announces the nomination of Robert W. Komer for Under Secretary of Defense for Policy.
- September 27 – President Carter announces the nomination of William E. Hallett for Commissioner of Indian Affairs.
- September 27 – President Carter announces the nomination of William B. Welsh for an Assistant Secretary of Health, Education, and Welfare.
- September 27 – President Carter announces the appointments of twelve individuals for membership on the National Highway Safety Advisory Committee.
- September 27 – In a statement, President Carter lauds the House vote on the Education Department legislation as "a significant milestone in my effort to make the Federal Government more efficient" and thanks Chairman Jack Brooks and Speaker O'Neill for their leadership in securing its passage.
- September 27 – President Carter signs the Panama Canal Act of 1979 into law. The legislation implements the 1977 Panama Canal Treaty and insures the United States continues operating the Panama Canal through the Panama Canal Commission until 1999.
- September 28 – During an appearance in Room 450 of the Old Executive Office Building, President Carter announces his administration "has achieved a new national accord with the broadest possible impact in order to fight against inflation." The accord establishes a Pay Advisory Committee and a Price Advisory Committee.
- September 28 – In a message to Congress, President Carter reports "a routine revision to a previously transmitted deferral" for the Transportation Department.
- September 28 – President Carter issues a memorandum to the Administrator of the Agency for International Development on the subject of procuring grain in Nicaragua.

== October ==
- October 1 – President Carter issues a message to Congress on the budget rescission and deferrals.
- October 1 – President Carter delivers an evening Oval Office address on Soviet Union combat troops in Cuba and the SALT treaty.
- October 2 – President Carter meets with President of Liberia William R. Tolbert, Jr. in the Cabinet Room for "a warm and comprehensive exchange of views on bilateral and regional issues."
- October 2 – Reubin O'D. Askew is sworn in as the 7th United States Trade Representative in the East Room.
- October 2 – President Carter sends a message to Congress on the subject of the National Wild and Scenic Rivers and National Trails Systems.
- October 2 – In a message to Congress, President Carter transmits his "recommendations and proposals with respect to the designation of the Tuolumne River in California."
- October 4 – President Carter signs the Health Planning and Resources Development Amendments of 1979 into law. The legislation is said by Carter to be an extension of the health planning program and states his disappointment that the bill "contains amendments which may weaken the authority of planning agencies to control unnecessary spending and continues unneeded construction authorities."
- October 4 – In a statement, President Carter says approval by the Senate of an energy mobilization board "represents a major step forward in the joint effort of the Congress and my administration to achieve energy security for our Nation."
- October 4 – President Carter announces the nomination of Barbara W. Newell for the position of ambassador during her tenure in Paris as U.S. permanent representative to the United Nations Educational, Scientific and Cultural Organization (UNESCO).
- October 4 – President Carter announces the designation of McGeorge Bundy as chairman of the General Advisory Committee to the Arms Control and Disarmament Agency.
- October 4 – President Carter announces the designation of Harold Howe as chairman of the National Council on Educational Research.
- October 5 – President Carter announces the nomination of Billy M. Wise for Assistant Secretary of Health, Education, and Welfare.
- October 10 – President Carter announces the nomination of Robert B. Oakley for Ambassador Extraordinary and Plenipotentiary of the United States to the Republic of Zaire.
- October 10 – President Carter announces the nomination of Anne Forrester Holloway for Ambassador Extraordinary and Plenipotentiary of the United States to the Republic of Mali.
- October 10 – President Carter signs the Federal Magistrate Act of 1979 into law. President Carter says the legislation "will expand the jurisdiction of United States magistrates in both civil and criminal cases, and will ensure that magistrates are appointed on merit" and "improve the capabilities and efficiency of the Federal court system, while at the same time preserving parties' rights and reducing the expense of litigation."
- October 10 – President Carter signs S. 756 into law, an authorization of appropriations for the Office of Federal Procurement Policy for fiscal years 1980 through 1983.
- October 17 – President Carter signs the Department of Education Organization Act into law during a morning signing ceremony in the East Room. The act separates the United States Department of Health and Human Services the Department of Education.
- October 17 – In a statement, President Carter notes the fifteenth anniversary of the beginning of Job Corps and its contributions to society.
- October 17 – President Carter announces the nomination of Joan Zeldes Bernstein for General Counsel of the Department of Health, Education, and Welfare.
- October 17 – President Carter announces the nomination of William G. Bowdler for Assistant Secretary of State for Inter-American Affairs.
- October 17 – President Carter announces the nomination of Frederick A. Rody, Jr. for Deputy Administrator of the Drug Enforcement Administration in the Department of Justice.
- October 17 – President Carter announces the appointment of two individuals for membership on the board of directors of the Federal Prison Industries, Inc., in the Department of Justice.
- October 17 – President Carter announces the nomination of N. Jerold Cohen for Chief Counsel of the Internal Revenue Service in the Department of the Treasury.
- October 30 – President Carter speaks on his receiving of the final report by the commission investigating the Three Mile Island accident during a morning appearance in the Briefing Room.
- October 30 – In a statement, President Carter speaks of his conviction that Shirley Hufstedler is ideal for the position of United States Secretary of Education.
- October 30 – President Carter announces the nomination of George W. Cunningham for Assistant Secretary of Energy for Nuclear Energy.
- October 30 – President Carter announces the nomination of Thomas E. Stelson for Assistant Secretary of Energy for Conservation and Solar Applications.
- October 30 – President Carter announces the reappointment of Stephen I. Danzansky for a four-year term of membership on the District of Columbia Law Revision Commission.
- October 30 – President Carter announces the nomination of Robert Hormats for Deputy Special Representative for Trade Negotiations.
- October 30 – President Carter announces the nomination of Patricia M. Byrne for Ambassador Extraordinary and Plenipotentiary of the United States to the Socialist Republic of the Union of Burma.
- October 30 – The Senate Energy and Natural Resources Committee votes in favor of the Alaska lands bill. In a statement, President Carter thanks senators Jackson and Tsongas in particular for their support of the measure.
- October 31 – President Carter delivers a Briefing Room address in which he announces steps being taken by the administration to further industrial innovation in the US "and more generally with similar types of economic problems that will be facing our country in the 1980's."
- October 31 – In a message to Congress, President Carter addresses industrial innovation and announces measures he writes "will help ensure our country's continued role as the world's leader in industrial innovation."
- October 31 – President Carter issues a memorandum on the Small Business Administration.

== November ==
- November 1 – President Carter announces the appointment of Fernando Manfredo as Deputy Administrator of the Panama Canal Commission.
- November 1 – President Carter issues a statement on the death of Mamie Eisenhower, calling her a "warm and gracious First Lady".
- November 1 – President Carter presents the President's Environmental Youth Awards in the Rose Garden.
- November 1 – President Carter announces the nomination of Robert H. Harris for membership on the Council on Environmental Quality.
- November 1 – President Carter announces the nomination of Angler Biddle Duke, of New York City, to be Ambassador Extraordinary and Plenipotentiary of the United States to the Kingdom of Morocco.
- November 1 – President Carter announces the nomination of Victor Marrero for Under Secretary of Housing and Urban Development.
- November 2 – President Carter issues Proclamation 4698, designating November 4, 1979 as "Will Rogers Day".
- November 28 – President Carter announces the nomination of Togo D. West, Jr. for General Counsel of the Department of Defense.
- November 28 – President Carter announces the nomination of William A. Lubbers for General Counsel of the National Labor Relations Board (NLRB).
- November 28 – President Carter announces the nomination of Michael J. Calhoun for membership on the United States International Trade Commission.
- November 28 – President Carter announces the nomination of Robert E. Baldwin for membership on the United States International Trade Commission.
- November 28 – President Carter holds his fifty-third news conference in the East Room. President Carter answers questions on Iran, the American political climate, embassy security, Henry Kissinger, American relations with Islamic nations, the Iran hostage crisis, and the Shah investigation.
- November 29 – President Carter issues Executive Order 12173, instating a continuation of existing Panama Canal regulations.
- November 29 – President Carter announces the nomination of Sanford M. Litvack for Assistant Attorney General.
- November 29 – President Carter announces the nomination of Marvin S. Cohen for reappointment for membership on the Civil Aeronautics Board.
- November 30 – President Carter signs Executive Order 12174 during a morning appearance in the Cabinet Room. The legislation sets a limit on paperwork budget which can only be overlooked by federal agencies with the president's approval.
- November 30 – During a morning appearance in the Briefing Room, Press Secretary Powell announces President Carter "intends to nominate Victor Palmieri as Ambassador at Large, with special responsibilities for coordinating refugee affairs."
- November 30 – President Carter announces the nomination of Ira M. Schwartz for Associate Administrator of Law Enforcement Assistance.
- November 30 – President Carter announces the nomination of Leslie J. Goldman for Assistant Secretary of Energy.
- November 30 – President Carter announces the nomination of John A. Calhoun III for Chief of the Children's Bureau at the Department of Health, Education, and Welfare.
- November 30 – President Carter releases a statement on the Final Act of the Conference on Security and Cooperation in Europe affirming the commitment of the US to human rights both domestic and abroad.
- November 30 – President Carter signs H.R. 4440 into law. The legislation serves to fund the Interstate Commerce Commission, the commission's regulation of trucking and railroads being said by President Carter to be "a top item on the regulatory reform agenda for 1980."

== December ==
- December 2 – In a statement, President Carter says the Shah will be cared for in "a secure convalescent facility where he can recuperate pending further travel plans" courtesy of an agreement by the American government.
- December 4 – President Carter announces the appointment of eleven members to the Architectural and Transportation Barriers Compliance Board.
- December 4 – President Carter announces his re-election campaign in the East Room. The speech states his intentions over the course of running for a second term and reflects on his tenure.
- December 7 – President Carter issues Executive Order 12176, extending the time the President's Commission on the Coal Industry has to complete its report.
- December 7 – President Carter announces the nomination of Deane R. Hinton for Assistant Secretary of State.
- December 7 – President Carter delivers remarks on the Iran hostage crisis in the lobby at the State Department, reaffirming his commitment to resolving the dispute without "any military action that would cause bloodshed or arouse the unstable captors of our hostages to attack them or to punish them".
- December 9 – President Carter attends a fundraising dinner for the O'Neill Chair at Boston College in the Regency Ballroom at the Hyatt Regency Hotel.
- December 10 – The five members of the Federal Council on the Aging are sworn in during an afternoon ceremony in the Cabinet Room.
- December 10 – President Carter announces the nomination of John H. Dalton for membership on the Federal Home Loan Bank Board.
- December 10 – President Carter announces the nomination of Sidney Anders Rand for Ambassador Extraordinary and Plenipotentiary of the United States to Norway.
- December 11 – President Carter announces the nomination of Homer E. Moyer, Jr. for General Counsel of the Commerce Department.
- December 12 – President Carter addresses members of the Business Council on the administration's defense policy during an afternoon appearance in the East Room.
- December 12 – President Carter announces the nomination of Albert P. Smith for Federal Cochairman of the Appalachian Regional Commission.
- December 12 – President Carter announces the nomination of Joseph A. Doyle for Assistant Secretary of the Navy.
- December 13 – President Carter signs S. 239 into law. President Carter says the legislation reauthorizes "funding for the domestic volunteer service programs administered by the ACTION agency."
- December 13 – President Carter announces the nomination of James W. Spain for Ambassador Extraordinary and Plenipotentiary of the United States to Turkey.
- December 13 – Press Secretary Jody Powell responds to the reports of international observers being allowed to see those captive in the Iran hostage crisis during a White House briefing.
- December 13 – President Carter attends a session of a White House briefing with Gannett newspaper and broadcast executives in Room 450 of the Old Executive Office Building.
- December 13 – President Carter attends the Christmas Pageant of Peace on the Ellipse.
- December 14 – In a message to Congress, President Carter transmits "the attached study of the feasibility of adding the Cahaba River in Alabama to the national Wild and Scenic Rivers system."
- December 14 – President Carter announces the three individuals being appointed to the Emergency Board to investigate the Long Island railroad dispute.
- December 14 – President Carter issues a memorandum on international trade negotiations between the US and other regions.
- December 17 – President Carter attends the South Lawn welcoming ceremony for Prime Minister of the United Kingdom Margaret Thatcher.
- December 17 – President Carter issues Executive Order 12184, establishing the President's Special Commission for the Study of Ethical Problems in Medicine and Biomedical and Behavioral Research.
- December 17 – The White House releases a statement confirming that a settlement has been reached in the Rhodesjan settlement.
- December 17 – President Carter attends the lighting of the National Menorah at Lafayette Square.
- December 19 – President Carter announces the nomination of Colbert I. King for United States Executive Director of the International Bank for Reconstruction and Development.
- December 19 – President Carter announces the nomination of David S. King for U.S. Alternate Executive Director of the International Bank for Reconstruction and Development.
- December 19 – President Carter accepts the resignation of George M. Seignious as director of the U.S. Arms Control and Disarmament Agency. President Carter announces the nomination Ralph Earle III to succeed Seignious as director.
- December 19 – President Carter announces the nomination of Matthew Nimetz for Under Secretary of State for Security Assistance, Science and Technology.
- December 19 – President Carter announces the nomination of Rozanne L. Ridgway for the position of Counselor to the Department of State.
- December 19 – President Carter announces the nomination of Joseph Charles Zengerle III for Assistant Secretary of the Air Force.
- December 20 – President Carter transmits the treaty between the United States of America and Peru on the execution of penal sentences to the Senate in a message.
- December 24 – The Soviet–Afghan War begins with the deployment of the 40th Army.
- December 28 – President Carter meets with Israeli minister of defense Ezer Weizman.
- December 29 – President Carter signs the Department of Energy National Security and Military Applications of Nuclear Energy Authorization Act of 1980 into law. The legislation authorizes appropriations for the national security programs of the Energy Department in the 1980 fiscal year and "the creation of a facility to demonstrate the feasibility of storing certain nuclear wastes from defense activities."
- December 31 – In a statement, President Carter notes his satisfaction with signing H.R. 5079, authorizing American participation in Energy-Expo '82, the International Energy Exposition to be held in Knoxville, Tennessee, in 1982.
- December 31 – President Carter signs the Meat Import Act of 1979 into law. President Carter says the legislation "provides that at least 1.25 billion pounds of imported beef will be available each year."

== See also ==
- Timeline of the Jimmy Carter presidency, for an index of the Carter presidency timeline articles

U.S. presidential administration timelines
Preceded by Carter presidency (1978)	Carter presidency (1979)	Succeeded by Carter presidency (1980–1981)
