= Timeline of the Jimmy Carter presidency (1980–1981) =

The following is a timeline of the presidency of Jimmy Carter, from January 1, 1980, to January 20, 1981.

== January 1980 ==
- January 1 – President Carter designates April 22, 1980 as "Earth Day".
- January 2 – President Carter signs Executive Order 12188, a trade reorganization, in the East Room of the White House during the afternoon. President Carter holds an afternoon meeting with the National Security Council and other senior advisers in relation to the Iran hostage crisis and the Soviet–Afghan War.
- January 3 – President Carter announces the recess appointment of William Joseph Driver for Commissioner of Social Security. President Carter signs the National Capital Transportation Amendments of 1979, providing an authorization of additional federal funding to see to the completion of the full Washington metropolitan area rapid transit system.
- January 4 – President Carter delivers an address on the Soviet–Afghan War in the Oval Office during the evening.
- January 6 – President Carter holds a meeting with Secretary-General of the United Nations Kurt Waldheim in the Oval Office for a detailed review of Waldheim's trip to Tehran during the evening.
- January 7 – President Carter issues a memorandum on agricultural commodities shipments to the Soviet Union. President Carter signs the Chrysler Corporation Loan Guarantee Act of 1979, allowing the federal government "to guarantee $1 1/2 billion in loans to Chrysler from private sources, provided an additional $2 billion in commitments or concessions can be arranged by Chrysler for the financing of its operations."
- January 10 – President Carter announces the nomination of David Bronheim for Associate Director of the United States International Development Cooperation Agency. President Carter delivers a speech on energy conversion in the State Dining Room at the White House during the morning.
- January 11 – President Carter delivers an address on regulatory reform in Room 450 of the Old Executive Office Building during the afternoon.
- January 12 – President Carter meets with Pakistan Minister of Foreign Affairs Agha Shahi in the Oval Office for discussions on international peace and potential American involvement with the current affairs of Pakistan during the afternoon.
- January 13 – President Carter issues a memorandum over the federal procurement policy of his administration to heads of departments and agencies. President Carter delivers an address to the first White House Conference on Small Business in the International Ballroom at the Washington Hilton Hotel during the evening.
- January 14 – President Carter submits a message to Congress over his administration's plans for the economy. President Carter releases a statement in response to the Soviet Union's veto of the United Nations Security Council resolution pertaining to Iran exposes. President Carter meets with Prime Minister of Spain Adolfo Suarez to discuss international issues in the Cabinet Room. President Carter delivers a speech at the presentation ceremony for the National Medal of Science in the East Room at the White House during the morning.
- January 15 – President Carter announces the appointment of Edward B. Cohen for deputy director of the U.S. Office of Consumer Affairs. President Carter announces the receipts of the President's Award for Distinguished Federal Civilian Service.
- January 16 – President Carter announces the designation of Thomas F. Murphy for acting chairman of the Pennsylvania Avenue Development Corporation. President Carter issues Executive Order 12189, amending the Emergency Petroleum Allocation Act of 1973 "to provide that certain oil is exempt from price controls on and after August 17, 1979, and that other oil is exempt on and after December 21, 1979".
- January 17 – President Carter meets with Vice-President of Egypt Muhammad Husni Mubarak to discuss issues relating to the Middle East and Southwest Asia in the Oval Office.
- January 18 – President Carter issues Proclamation 4714, imposing a temporary duty increase on anhydrous ammonia from the U.S.S.R. being imported into the United States.
- January 19 – President Carter releases a statement on the death of William O. Douglas. President Carter issues Proclamation 4715, ordering the American flag be flown at half-staff in honor of Douglas on all buildings, grounds and naval vessels pertaining to the federal government in "the District of Columbia and throughout the United States and its Territories and possessions until his interment."
- January 20 – President Carter participates in an interview with Meet the Press during the afternoon.
- January 21 – President Carter delivers an address at the annual convention for the National Religious Broadcasters Association in the International Ballroom at the Washington Hilton Hotel during the evening. President Carter wins the Iowa caucuses in the Democratic presidential primary.
- January 22 – President Carter announces the nomination of Robert E. White for Ambassador Extraordinary and Plenipotentiary of the United States to El Salvador. President Carter meets with Federal Republic of Germany Foreign Minister Hans-Dietrich Genscher, Vice President Mondale, Secretary of State Vance, and Assistant to the President for National Security Affairs Zbigniew Brzezinski for discussions on foreign policy as it relates to the Soviet-Afghan War during the morning.
- January 24–25 – President Carter meets with Prime Minister of Italy Francesco Cossiga for discussions on relations between the US and Italy.
- January 24 – President Carter announces the nomination of John B. Gabusi for Assistant Secretary of Education for Management.
- January 27 – President Carter delivers an address at the Annual Hubert H. Humphrey Award Dinner in the Presidential Ballroom at the Capital Hilton Hotel during the evening.
- January 29 – President Carter meets with President of the European Parliament Simone Veil for a discussion on the European Parliament. President Carter issues Proclamation 4719, designating the week beginning on March 16 as "National Poison Prevention Week".
- January 30 – President Carter announces the nomination of Herta Lande Seidman for Assistant Secretary of Commerce for Trade Development.
- January 31 – President Carter announces the appointment of six individuals for membership on the National Advisory Council on the Education of Disadvantaged Children.

== February ==
- February 1 – President Carter delivers an address to the National Conference on Physical Fitness and Sports in the Regency Ballroom at the Shoreham Americana Hotel during the morning. President Carter transmits a message to Congress on the United States-Switzerland Agreement on Social Security. President Carter signs Executive Order 12190, establishing the creation of "an advisory committee for certain purposes". President Carter issues Proclamtion 4720, enacting a modification on types of sugars, syrups, and molasses.
- February 4 – President Carter announces the appointments of Joan D. Manley, Dwight W. Mize, Julia M. Walsh, and Emily H. Womach to the President's Commission on Executive Exchange.
- February 5 – President Carter transmits a report to Congress on the National Advisory Council on Economic Opportunity. The House of Representatives passes the Water Resources Development Act of 1979. A statement is released indicating President Carter's dissatisfaction with the passage of the law and his wishes for "the Senate to correct these problems by adopting a bill in accord with sound water policy."
- February 7 – President Carter attends the annual National Prayer Breakfast in the International Ballroom at the Washington Hilton Hotel during the morning. President Carter delivers a speech at the annual conference of the Consumer Federation of America in the Presidential Ballroom of the Capitol Hilton Hotel during the morning.
- February 8 – President Carter announces the nominations of Homer F. Broome, Jr. for administrator of the Law Enforcement Assistance Administration, and Marvin Weissman for Ambassador Extraordinary and Plenipotentiary of the United States to Bolivia.
- February 10 – President Carter wins the Maine caucuses in the Democratic presidential primary.
- February 11 – President Carter announces the nomination of Guy Feliz Erb for deputy director of the International Development Cooperation Agency, and the nominations of James R. Mills and Frank H. Neel for membership on the board of directors of the National Railroad Passenger Corporation.
- February 12 – President Carter issues Executive Order 12192, forming "an advisory committee on radioactive waste management". President Carter submits a message to Congress in regards to radioactive waste management.
- February 20 – President Carter meets with President of Kenya Daniel arap Moi in the Cabinet Room for discussions on relations between the United States and Republic of Kenya during the morning. President Carter issues a statement on the death of Alice Roosevelt Longworth.
- February 21 – President Carter delivers a speech on energy and national security during a White House briefing in the East Room of the White House during the afternoon.
- February 22 – President Carter attends a White House reception for the champion teams for both basketball and football in the East Room during the afternoon. President Carter announces the nomination of Karen Hastie Williams for administrator for federal procurement policy in the Office of Management and Budget.
- February 25 – President Carter delivers an address at the welcoming ceremony for American athletes, following the conclusion of the 1980 Winter Olympics, in the South Lawn of the White House. President Carter and First Lady Carter host the athletes in the State Dining Room.
- February 26 – President Carter issues Executive Order 12196, concerning safety and health programs for employees of the federal government. President Carter announces the nomination of Stephen Berger for chairman of the board of directors of the United States Railway Association.
- February 27 – President Carter announces the nomination of James Eugene Goodby for Ambassador Extraordinary and Plenipotentiary of the United States to Finland.
- February 28 – President Carter releases a statement on National Women's History Week. President Carter delivers an address on law enforcement in the East Room at the White House during the afternoon.
- February 29 – President Carter announces the nomination of Lyle E. Gramley for membership on the board of governors of the Federal Reserve System to replace the term-expired Philip Coldwell. It is announced that an inter-agency review of non-rubber footwear imports aligned with President Carter's import relief program "has led to the conclusion that imports are expected to fall significantly below 1979 levels toward presurge levels and that import surges such as were experienced last year will not recur."

== March ==
- March 3 – President Carter announces the nominations of F. James Rutherford for Assistant Secretary of Education for Research and Improvement, Thomas Kendall Minter for Assistant Secretary of Education for Elementary and Secondary Education, and Albert H. Bowker for Assistant Secretary of Education for Postsecondary Education.
- March 4 – President Carter announces the nomination of Joseph C. Wheeler for deputy administrator of the Agency for International Development.
- March 5 – The White House releases a statement on the tenth anniversary of the enacting of the Treaty on the Non-Proliferation of Nuclear Weapons. President Carter signs H.R. 3757, establishing the Channel Islands National Park. President Carter issues Executive Order 12197, conforming the Central Intelligence Agency Retirement and Disability System to a number of amendments within the Civil Service Retirement and Disability System.
- March 7 – President Carter announces the nomination of Charles William Snodgrass for Assistant Secretary of the Air Force. President Carter issues Proclamation 4731, designating the month of April 1980 as "Cancer Control Month".
- March 10 – President Carter issues Proclamation 4732, designating the upcoming April 14 as "Pan American Day" and the week starting with April 13 as "Pan American Week".
- March 11 – President Carter announces his nomination of William C. Gardner for the District of Columbia Superior Court.
- March 12 – President Carter delivers a speech commemorating the fifteenth anniversary of the Head Start program in the East Room at the White House during the afternoon. President Carter issues Executive Order 12198, imposing amendments to the Manual for Courts-Martial United States, 1969. President Carter signs H.R. 3756, a territories bill that authorizes "appropriations for certain insular areas of the United States, and for other purposes."
- March 14 – President Carter signs H.R. 4337 into law, the bill both a reorganization of the Foreign Claims Settlement Commission as well as an abolition of the Annual Assay Commission, the U.S. Marine Corps Memorial Commission, and the Low-Emission Vehicle Certification Board. President Carter delivers a televised and radio broadcast address on the current status of inflation within the United States in the East Room at the White House during the afternoon. President Carter holds the fifty-fifth news conference of his tenure in the East Room during the evening. President Carter issues Executive Order 12201, imposing regulations on credit for the prevention of inflation "generated by the extension of credit in an excessive volume".
- March 17 – President Carter delivers an address at the Annual Congressional-City Conference in the International Ballroom at the Washington Hilton Hotel during the afternoon. President Carter commemorates St. Patrick's Day with an address in the East Room at the White House during the evening.
- March 18 – President Carter signs the Agricultural Adjustment Act of 1980, an amendment of the Food and Agriculture Act of 1977, and the Refugee Act of 1980, revising American provisions on refugee admissions and assistance, into law. President Carter issues Executive Order 12202, establishing the Nuclear Safety Oversight Committee.
- March 19 – President Carter announces the nominations of eleven members on the President's Commission on United States-Liberian Relations, John J. Sheehan for membership on the National Commission on Air Quality, and Robert E. Nederlander for membership on the National Council on Educational Research. President Carter transmits the eighth report on the status of federal advisory committees to Congress.
- March 20 – President Carter announces the nomination of Joan F. Tobin for reappointment as a member of the board of directors of the Communication Satellite Corporation.
- March 21 – President Carter delivers an address to the 1980 Summer Olympics United States teams representatives in the East Room at the White House, and meets with small business leaders in the Cabinet Room at the White House for their participation in his anti-inflation program during the afternoon.
- March 22 – President Carter wins the Virginia Democratic caucus in his party's presidential primary. The White House releases a statement in response to the win.
- March 23 – President Carter delivers an address on the anniversary of the signing of the Egyptian-Israeli Peace Treaty in the East Room of the White House during the afternoon.
- March 24 – President Carter issues a statement on the death of American economist Arthur M. Okun.
- March 25 – President Carter issues a statement on the assassination of Óscar Romero the previous day.
- March 26 – President Carter delivers an address at the White House Conference on Aging reception in the East Room of the White House during the afternoon.
- March 27 – President Carter sends Congress a message on the Nuclear Regulatory Commission. President Carter issues Executive Order 12204, instating an amendment to the generalized system of preferences.
- March 29 – President Carter announces the nomination of James E. Jones, Jr. for chairman of the Special Panel.

== April ==
- April 1 – President Carter answers questions from reporters pertaining to the Iran hostage crisis in the Oval Office during the morning. President Carter delivers an address in the International Ballroom at the Washington Hilton Hotel during the afternoon. President Carter wins the Democratic presidential primaries in Wisconsin and Kansas. Press Secretary Jody Powell says President Carter is appreciative of those who worked for his wins in the two states.
- April 2 – President Carter attends a White House reception for the National Conference of Artists in the East Room at the White House during the afternoon.
- April 3 – President Carter announces the nominations for three members of the Commission on Civil Rights.
- April 8–9 – President Carter meets with President of Egypt Anwar Sadat for discussion on current intentional issues.
- April 8 – President Carter signs H.R. 6585, an extension of the Reorganization Act of 1977, into law.
- April 9 – President Carter and President Sadat make a joint appearance on the South Grounds during the morning.
- April 10 – President Carter announces the nominations of Thomas G. Allison for general counsel of the Department of Transportation, and Gordon R. Beyer for Ambassador Extraordinary and Plenipotentiary of the United States to Uganda. President Carter delivers a praising speech on Frances Perkins on the steps of the Frances Perkins Building during the morning.
- April 11 – President Carter issues a statement on the following day marking the twenty-fifth anniversary of the Polio vaccine field trial announcement. President Carter meets with Mayor of West Berlin Dietrich Stobbe to talk about foreign policy during the morning. President Carter delivers a speech on a variety of issues in the East Room during the afternoon. President Carter announces the appointment of Alfred H. Moses for special adviser to the president.
- April 12 – President Carter issues Executive Order 12207, instating an emergency board for the investigation of a dispute between "the Port Authority Trans-Hudson Corporation and certain of its employees represented by the Brotherhood of Railway Carmen of the United States and Canada." President Carter announces the creation of the dispute emergency board. President Carter answers questions pertaining to his administration's foreign policy in the Oval Office during the morning. Vice President Mondale states that President Carter and Congress will remain supportive of the United States Olympic Committee House of Delegates in its attempt to strengthen its financial position.
- April 17 – President Carter holds a news conference, the sixty-fifth of his presidency, in the East Room during the afternoon.
- April 21 – President Carter delivers remarks from the Oval Office during the afternoon.
- April 22 – President Carter announces the nominations of Sheldon V. Ekman and Edna Gaynell Parker as judges for the United States Tax Court.
- April 23 – Press Secretary Powell makes a statement favorable of the European Community supporting added sanctions to Iran while in the Briefing Room during the afternoon. President Carter announces the nomination of Edwin W. Martin, Jr. for Assistant Secretary of Education for Special Education and Rehabilitative Services.
- April 24 – President Carter announces the nominations of Richard John Rios for director of the Community Services Administration, and Cynthia G. Brown for Assistant Secretary of Education for Civil Rights. President Carter signs H.R. 6464, a bill that he says will expedite the transfer of "the Army Missile Plant in Sterling Heights, Michigan, from the Army, which will have no further use for it in just a few months, to the organization in Michigan, the Michigan Job Development Authority, responsible for employment and for jobs that are productive and helpful."
- April 25 – The White House releases a statement on Operation Eagle Crew stating the sequence of events and President Carter's regrets toward the deaths. President Carter delivers an evening Oval Office address on Operation Eagle Claw.

== May ==
- May 1 – President Carter announces the nominations of fourteen individuals for membership on the National Council on the Handicapped, three individuals for membership on the President's Advisory Committee for Women, and John David Hughes for membership on the Federal Energy Regulatory Commission. President Carter attends and delivers an address at the President's Committee on Employment of the Handicapped annual meeting in the International Ballroom at the Washington Hilton Hotel during the morning.
- May 2 – President Carter issues Executive Order 12213, having to do with the organization of the United States Holocaust Memorial Council. The White House announces further actions being taken by the federal government in response to actions by the Cuban government.
- May 4 – President Carter issues a statement on the death of President of Yugoslavia Josip Broz Tito.
- May 5 – President Carter answers questions at the League of Women Voters Biennial National Convention in the Sheraton Washington Hotel during the morning. President Carter announces the nomination of Martha Elizabeth Keys for Assistant Secretary of Education for Legislation.
- May 7 – The White House announces Fort Chaffee, Arkansas will be the site of temporary housing for Cuban refugees during their awaiting of resettlement. President Carter announces the appointment of five members to the Nuclear Safety Oversight Committee, and five members of the National Advisory Council on Indian Education.
- May 8 – President Carter attends a White House reception for the Labor Council for Latin American Advancement in the East Room during the afternoon. Edmund Muskie is sworn in as the 58th United States Secretary of State in the East Room during the evening.
- May 9 – President Carter announces the nomination of George William Ashworth for assistant director of the U.S. Arms Control and Disarmament Agency. President Carter attends and delivers an address at the memorial service for the American service members killed during Operation Eagle Claw in the Memorial Amphitheater at Arlington National Cemetery during the morning.
- May 13 – President Carter announces the nominations of Francis J. McNeil for Ambassador Extraordinary and Plenipotentiary of the United States to Costa Rica, and Theresa Ann Healy for Ambassador Extraordinary and Plenipotentiary of the United States to Sierra Leone. President Carter issues a statement on Comptroller General Elmer Staats' first annual evaluation of the implementation of the Civil Service Reform Act by the federal government.
- May 14 – President Carter announces the appointments of six individuals for membership on the National Cancer Advisory Board, and five individuals for membership on the board of directors of the Federal National Mortgage Association.
- May 19 – President Carter announces the nominations of three individuals for governors of the United States Postal Service, and two individuals for the membership on the United States Metric Board.
- May 20 – President Carter announces the White House Fellows for the 1980 to 1981 year appointments.
- May 21 – President Carter announces the appointment of two individuals for membership on the President's Commission on White House Fellowships.
- May 27 – President Carter announces the nominations of Michael T. Blouin for assistant director of the Community Services Administration, and Janet Dempsey Steiger for Commissioner of the Postal Rate Commission. President Carter delivers a speech in the East Room during the afternoon.
- May 29 – President Carter issues a statement on the shooting of Vernon Jordan. President Carter announces the nomination of Richard Lee McCall, Jr. for Assistant Secretary of State for International Organization Affairs. President Carter attends a fundraising dinner in the Grand Ballroom at the Cleveland Plaza Hotel in Cleveland, Ohio during the evening.

== June ==
- June 1 – President Carter visits Vernon Jordan at Fort Wayne Hospital in Fort Wayne, Indiana and answers questions there during the afternoon.
- June 2 – President Carter announces the nomination of Donald N. Langenberg for deputy director of the National Science Foundation. President Carter announces the appointment of Paul Bock for membership on the National Advisory Committee on Oceans and Atmosphere.
- June 3 – President Carter delivers a speech at a party for his re-election campaign at Liberty Plaza during the evening. The White House releases a statement on the bombing of the home of Vladimir Sindjelic indicating President Carter's condemnation of the act.
- June 4 – President Carter announces the nominations of Frances D. Cook for Ambassador Extraordinary and Plenipotentiary of the United States to the Republic of Burundi, and Jerrold Martin North for Ambassador Extraordinary and Plenipotentiary of the United States to the Republic of Djibouti.
- June 5 – President Carter delivers an address at the opening session of the White House Conference on Families at the Baltimore Convention Center in Baltimore, Maryland during the afternoon. President Carter issues a statement on the transportation of Cuban refugees to the US outlining guidelines and provisions on how the process will be carried out.
- June 6 – President Carter announces the nomination of Kennon V. Rothchild for reappointment for membership on the board of directors of the National Corporation for Housing Partnerships. President Carter announces the appointment of appointment of two individuals for membership on the National Armed Forces Museum Advisory Board of the Smithsonian Institution.
- June 9 – President Carter delivers a speech at the Annual Convention of the Opportunities Industrialization Centers of America in the Grand Ballroom at the Fontainebleau Hotel in Miami Beach, Florida during the afternoon. President Carter announces the nominations of Patricia P. Bailey for reappointment as a Federal Trade Commissioner, and Lindsay D. Norman, Jr. for director of the Bureau of Mines.
- June 10 – President Carter gives a speech to the Annual Conference of the U.S. Conference of Mayors in the Grand Ballroom at the Olympic Hotel during the morning. President Carter delivers an address to the National Mental Health Association in the Regency Ballroom at the Shoreham Hotel during the evening.
- June 11 – President Carter addresses the National Neighborhood Commission during an afternoon appearance in the Rose Garden. President Carter announces the nomination of Jack R. Borsting for Assistant Secretary of Defense (Comptroller).
- June 12 – President Carter announces the nominations of William J. Dyess for Assistant Secretary of State for Public Affairs, and James Bert Thomas, Jr. for Inspector General of the Department of Education. President Carter announces the appointment of seven individuals for membership on the National Advisory Committee for Juvenile Justice and Delinquency Prevention.
- June 13 – President Carter announces the nominations of Peter Adams Sutherland for Ambassador Extraordinary and Plenipotentiary of the United States to the State of Bahrain, and Hume Alexander Horan for Ambassador Extraordinary and Plenipotentiary of the United States to the United Republic of Cameroon and to the Republic of Equatorial Guinea.
- June 17 – President Carter signs the Adoption Assistance and Child Welfare Act of 1980, legislation that he says provides "important protections for children and their families". President Carter issues a statement on Independence Day. President Carter announces the nomination of Ethel Bent Walsh for reappointment as a member of the Equal Employment Opportunity Commission.
- June 23 – President Carter participates in an interview at the Venice Economic Summit Conference in the Cipriani Hotel during the evening.
- June 24 – President Carter speaks with reporters on the Coliseum during the afternoon.
- June 25 – President Carter announces the nomination of Thomas R. Donahue for membership on the board of directors of the Communications Satellite Corporation.
- June 26 – President Carter delivers a speech at the Chancery at the embassy the Madrid, Spain during the morning.

== July ==
- July 1 – President Carter approves the transportation of immediate U.S. airlift of military equipment to Thailand. President Carter issues Executive Order 12224, resulting in the implementation of the International Sugar Agreement. President Carter transmits a report of the Federal Juvenile Delinquency Programs to Congress.
- July 2 – President Carter signs the Small Business Development Act of 1980 in the Cabinet Room during the afternoon.
- July 28 – President Carter announces the appointment of 20 individuals for membership on the Intergovernmental Advisory Council on Education.
- July 29 – President Carter delivers an address to the Conference on Security and Cooperation in Europe during an afternoon ceremony commemorating the fifth anniversary of the Helsinki Accords. President Carter announces the nomination of Barbara S. Thomas for membership on the Securities and Exchange Commission. President Carter announces his designation of Alfred J. McGuire for chairman of the President's Council on Physical Fitness and Sports.

== August ==
- August 4 – President Carter signs the Ocean Thermal Energy Conversion Act of 1980 into law. President Carter announces the nomination of Henry L. Kimelman for Ambassador Extraordinary and Plenipotentiary of the United States to Haiti. President Carter issues Executive Order 12231, an attempt to meet "the goals and requirements for the strategic petroleum reserve".
- August 5 – President Carter announces the nomination of Richard B. Lowe III for inspector general of the Department of Health and Human Services.
- August 6 – President Carter delivers an address to the Annual Conference of the National Urban League in the Grand Ballroom at the New York Hilton Hotel during the morning.
- August 15 – President Carter answers questions from reporters on his re-election campaign in the Museum of Modern Art during the morning. President Carter delivers an address to a meeting of the Democratic National Committee in the Terrace Ballroom at the New York Statler Hotel during the morning.
- August 18 – President Carter sends a report to Congress on the subject of the Trade Agreements Program for 1979. President Carter sends Congress a report on the Railroad Retirement System.
- August 19 – President Carter announces the appointment of Frank E. Maestrone for special representative and director of the U.S. Sinai Support Mission. President Carter releases a statement expressing his favor toward the Senate's decision to approve the Alaska lands bill.
- August 21 – President Carter makes a joint appearance with Senator Ted Kennedy at the Logan International Airport in Boston, Massachusetts during the morning. President Carter delivers an address to the Annual Convention of the American Legion in the John B. Hynes Veterans Auditorium during the morning.
- August 22 – President Carter gives a speech to the Annual Conference of the American Federation of Teachers in the Renaissance Ballroom at the Detroit Plaza Hotel in Detroit, Michigan during the morning.
- August 25 – President Carter announces the nomination of Anne Thorsen Truax for membership on the National Advisory Council on Women's Educational Programs.
- August 28 – The White House announces the appointments of Dennis K. Rhoades for executive director of the Veterans Federal Coordinating Committee and Paul Weston for deputy director.
- August 29 – President Carter announces the nominations of six individuals for membership on the National Institute, and Francis Leon Jung for reappointment for membership on the Foreign Claims Settlement Commission of the United States.

== September ==
- September 12 – President Carter announces the nomination of five individuals for delegates and five individuals to serve as Alternates during the U.S. Delegation to the 21 st General Conference of the United Nations Educational, Scientific, and Cultural Organization.
- September 15 – President Carter gives a speech during his attending of a Democratic National Committee fundraising reception in Roswell, Georgia during the evening. President Carter announces the nomination of Carolyn Antonides Williams for membership on the President's Commission for the Study of Ethical Problems in Medicine and Biomedical and Behavioral Research. President Carter signs H.R. 2538, which he states will implement the bettering of "the Coast Guard's ability to enforce laws aimed at stopping illegal drug trafficking on the high seas."
- September 16 – President Carter delivers a speech at a fundraising dinner for the Democratic National Committee in Cleveland, Ohio during the evening.
- September 17 – During an afternoon Briefing Room appearance, Press Secretary Powell reiterate the Carter administration's request for Republican presidential nominee Reagan "to state his position on and to support the fair housing bill which is now in the Senate." President Carter makes a joint appearance with Vice Premier of the People's Republic of China Bo Yibo in the Rose Garden at the signing ceremony for the United States-People's Republic of China Agreements during the afternoon.

== November ==
- November 1 – President Carter gives a speech in the front lawn of Gorgas Hall at Texas Southmost College during the morning. President Carter delivers a speech in the New Orleans Room located within the Red Carpet Inn in Milwaukee, Wisconsin during the evening.
- November 2 – President Carter meets with reporters and answers questions in the Briefing Room at the White House during the evening.
- November 4 – President Carter loses by a landslide in the US presidential elections against Republican challenger Ronald Reagan.
- November 5 – President Carter tells reporters that he believes Reagan will maintain peace and pledges to smooth the transition of power.
- November 10 – President Carter announces the appointment of five individuals for membership on the Commission on Fine Arts.
- November 12 – President Carter transmits a message to Congress on the Council on Wage and Price Stability.
- November 13 – President Carter issues a statement in favor of the decision of the House of Representatives to approve the Alaska National Interest Lands Conservation Act.
- November 18 – President Carter announces the appointment of two individuals for membership on the board of trustees of the Woodrow Wilson International Center for Scholars. President Carter sends a report to Congress on federal civility and military pay increases.
- November 19 – President Carter announces the appointment of Roger Gettys Hill for membership on the President's Export Council. President Carter delivers an address at the tenth regular session of the General Assembly in the main auditorium at the Organization of American States Building during the morning.
- November 20 – President Carter meets with President-elect Reagan at the Oval Office to discuss the transition of power between the presidents. President Carter meets with Chancellor of the Federal Republic of Germany (West Germany) Helmut Schmidt for a discussion on a "wide range of political, security, and economic issues of mutual interest to the two countries."
- November 22 – President Carter issues a statement on the death of John William McCormack.
- November 24 – President Carter issues a statement on the death of John Pennington.
- November 25 – President Carter announces the nomination of Kelly E. Taggart for director of the Commissioned Officer Corps, National Oceanic and Atmospheric Administration, and the appointment of James A. Bradley for Federal Representative and chairman of the Canadian River Commission.
- November 26 – President Carter accepts the resignation of Counsel to the President Lloyd Cutler.

== December ==
- December 2 – President Carter attends a dinner in honor Lane Kirkland in the International Ballroom at the Washington Hilton Hotel during the evening. He also signs the Alaska National Interest Lands Conservation Act into law.
- December 4 – President Carter announces the appointment of Dayton L. Alverson for Commissioner of the United States Section of the International North Pacific Fisheries Commission.
- December 5 – President Carter announces the nomination of Wallace Nathaniel Hyde for membership on the board of governors of the U.S. Postal Service.
- December 23 – President Carter signs H.R. 8195, a bill that he says will provide "cost-of-living increase in the industry pension benefits of retired rail workers next year" along with directing "rail labor and management to report jointly their recommendations for sound longterm financing of their pension system by March 1, 1981."
- December 25 – President Carter speaks with reporters outside the home of his mother-in-law Allie Smith during the morning.
- December 26 – President Carter confirms to a reporter that he saw the Christmas tape of the Iran hostages and says the State Department will watch the longer version of the tape during an exchange with a reporter outside the Carters Warehouse during the morning.
- December 31 – President Carter issues Executive Order 12258, a continuation of federal advisory committees. President Carter signs Executive Order 12259, directed toward federal program fair housing. President Carter signs Executive Order 12260, an agreement on government procurement, into law. President Carter announces the appointment of Austin H. Middleton for membership on the board of visitors to the United States Naval Academy.

== January 1981 ==
- January 1 – Tehran Radio relays a declaration by Iranian leadership of its intent to try the 52 American hostages as spies if the American message being handled by Algerian intermediaries meet Iran's demands.
- January 4 – Iran's government confirms it is presently studying American proposals to solve the hostage crisis and has assumed full control over all the hostages following three being transported to an undisclosed location.
- January 6 – In a joint session of the United States Congress, the results for the electoral college are counted. In his role as President of the Senate, Vice President Walter Mondale reads the results and declares President-elect Ronald Reagan as the winner of the 1980 presidential election.
- January 6 – President Carter delivers his farewell address to the nation in the Oval Office.
- January 20 – President Carter completes his full term in office and leaves the White House for the final time as Commander-in-chief.
- January 20 – Ronald Reagan is inaugurated as the 40th president of the United States, at noon EST.
- January 20 – After the inauguration, Carter, now the former president, returns to Plains to begin his post-presidency.

== See also ==
- Timeline of the Jimmy Carter presidency, for an index of the Carter presidency timeline articles

U.S. presidential administration timelines
Preceded by Carter presidency (1979)	Carter presidency (1980–1981)	Succeeded by Reagan presidency (1981)
