= Timeline of the Jimmy Carter presidency (1978) =

The following is a timeline of the presidency of Jimmy Carter, from January 1, 1978, to December 31, 1978.

== January ==
- January 6 – While speaking to reporters aboard Air Force One, President Carter states his most recent tour has advanced the image of the United States as standing for "what is right and decent and good".
- January 15 – The Congressional Budget Office says it is mandatory that the United States spend 6 to 7 billion "for additional tanks, planes and supplies if it wants to use three extra divisions to reinforce NATO in a European war".
- January 20 – President Carter signs an Economic Report during a signing ceremony in the Roosevelt Room.
- January 20 – President Carter presents the Alexander Hamilton Award to Laurence N. Woodworth and Secretary of the Treasury W. Michael Blumenthal in the Roosevelt Room.
- January 20 – President Carter signs Executive Order 12035, an amendment of the first section of Executive Order 11861.
- January 20 – President Carter sends a report describing progression made during the previous sixty days on negotiations in regards to Cyprus to Congress in a message.
- January 20 – President Carter transmits the ninth annual report on the National Science Board in a message to Congress, saying the "data and indicators presented herein should prove useful to anyone needing an authoritative source of information on various aspects of the scientific enterprise in this country."
- January 20 – President Carter submits his annual economic message to Congress. He states his intent to collaborate with Congress on the development of a program intended to address both short- and long-term needs in the American economy in addition to his proposals of tax reductions alongside reforms "to continue our strong economic recovery, to encourage increased investment by American businesses, and to create a simpler and fairer tax system."
- January 20 – President Carter announces that starting the following day, "all imported sugar will be subject to fixed fees of 2.7 cents per pound for raw sugar and 3.22 cents per pound for refined sugar, not to exceed 50 percent of the value of imported sugar" and that directions have been administered to the International Trade Commission for an expanded investigation of import sugar intended to "determine whether sugar-containing products are being or will be imported in quantities and under conditions that will result in national interference to the sugar price support operations being conducted by the Department of Agriculture."
- January 24 – President Carter announces his issuing of an executive order "concerning the organization and control of United States foreign intelligence activities" that is intended to begin the process of developing "a foundation for the drafting of statutory charters".
- January 24 – President Carter announces the appointment of Charles H. Pillard for vice chairman of the President's Committee on Employment of the Handicapped.
- January 24 – President Carter announces the reappointment of Dennis A. Grotting for Commissioner of the United States Section of the International North Pacific Fisheries Commission.
- January 24 – President Carter transmits the 1976 Annual Report of the Federal Prevailing Rate Advisory Committee to Congress in a message.
- January 24 – President Carter announces the nominations of thirteen individuals for membership on the General Advisory Committee to the Arms Control and Disarmament Agency.
- January 24 – President Carter announces the appointment of eighteen individuals for membership on the National Advisory Committee on Oceans and Atmosphere.
- January 25 – President Carter announces the nomination of Omi G. Walden for Assistant Secretary of Energy.
- January 25 – President Carter announces the nomination of Robert B. Lagather for Assistant Secretary of Labor for Mine Safety and Health.
- January 25 – President Carter announces the appointment of Johnnie W. Prothro for membership on the board for International Food and Agricultural Development.
- January 25 – President Carter transmits the International Sugar Agreement to the Senate in a message, saying the agreement "seeks to stabilize sugar prices to meet both our domestic interests as a major consumer and producer of sugar, and our international interests as the world's largest importer of sugar."
- January 25 – President Carter meets with head of the delegation of parliamentarians of the Supreme Soviet visiting the United States Boris Ponomarev during the afternoon.
- January 26 – President Carter transmits proposed legislation that he says "will significantly improve the organization and operation of the Federal government's highway and transit programs" in a message to Congress.
- January 26 – President Carter announces the nomination of Frank Gregg for director of the Bureau of Land Management in the Interior Department.
- January 26 – President Carter announces the nomination of Elwood T. Driver for membership on the National Transportation Safety Board.
- January 27 – President Carter reports three proposals over the rescinding of a total of $55.3 million in budget authority Congress previously provided in a message to Congress.
- January 27 – President Carter issues a statement in observance of Black History Month, calling on Americans to pay "attention to the contributions of black people to our overall progress and development, the month of February thus serves to build goodwill and understanding between all people."
- January 29 – President Carter attends a White House reception for the tenth anniversary of Ford's Theatre in the East Room.
- January 30 – President Carter holds his twenty-fourth news conference in Room 450 of the Old Executive Office Building. President Carter begins a conference with an address on domestic programs and the Soviet satellite Cosmos 954, and answers questions on arms sales in the Middle East, American attorney David Marston, the Middle East, the Coal Strike, the nuclear-powered satellite, Soviet satellite Cosmos 954, illegal immigrants, satellite capabilities of the Soviet Union, the Nazi demonstration in Skokie, Illinois, domestic surveillance, farmers parity, and tax reduction and reform.
- January 30 – President Carter announces the renominations of Theodore Bikel, Maureen Dees, and Jacob Lawrence for membership on the National Council on the Arts.
- January 31 – President Carter transmits the eleventh quarterly report of the Council on Wage and Price Stability in a message to Congress.
- January 31 – President Carter signs Proclamation 4548, designating May 19, 1978, as "National Defense Transportation Day" in addition to the week beginning May 14, 1978, as "National Transportation Week."
- January 31 – President Carter signs Executive Order 12037, exempting Civil Aeronautics Board member G. Joseph Minetti from mandatory retirement until May 1, 1978, out of his belief that Minetti's continued service represents the best interest of the US.
- January 31 – Chairman of the Senate Foreign Relations Committee John C. Stennis announces his opposition to the Panama Canal treaties, citing their causing the US to withdrawal from the Canal Zone too rapidly, a move that he furthered would leave the US "highly uncertain what is going to happen down there".

== February ==
- February 1 – President Carter delivers an evening address in defense of the Panama Canal treaties from the Family Library of the White House. He says the only reason the treaties need approval is due to they're being "in the highest national interest of the United States" and would keep the US from involvement in a Panama jungles war.
- February 9 – President Carter transmits the Agreement between the United States of America and the International Atomic Energy Agency in a message to the Senate for ratification.
- February 9 – In a statement, the White House says President Carter "fulfilled a 10-year United States pledge for nuclear safeguards by submitting to the Senate for ratification a treaty with the International Atomic Energy Agency (IAEA)."
- February 9 – President Carter announces the nomination of Robert M. Sayre for Ambassador Extraordinary and Plenipotentiary of the United States to Brazil.
- February 9 – President Carter announces the nomination of Galen L. Stone, of Washington, D.C., to be Ambassador Extraordinary and Plenipotentiary of the United States to the Republic of Cyprus.
- February 9 – President Carter announces the appointment of James P. Grant for U.S. Representative on the executive board of the United Nations Children's Fund.
- February 10 – President Carter attends a White House reception for the board of directors of the National Education Association in the State Dining Room.
- February 10 – President Carter announces the nomination of Gloria Cusumano Jimenez for Federal Insurance Administrator.
- February 17 – President Carter holds his twenty-fifth news conference in the Ballroom at the Cranston Hilton Hotel. Carter begins the conference with an address on the Coal strike and American economy, answering questions from reporters on the arm sales in the Middle East, disaster assistance for New England, nuclear power plant construction, Lincoln Almond, the Humphrey-Hawkins bill, and Indian land claims.
- February 17 – President Carter attends a reception for Senator Claiborne Pell at the Cranston Hilton Hotel in Providence, Rhode Island.
- February 17 – President Carter attends a fundraising dinner for Senator William D. Hathaway at the Penobscot Valley Country Club.
- February 17 – During a town hall in Bangor, Maine, President Carter delivers an address on energy and answers questions on regulations of business, government contracts, national health insurance, mental health care, aid to parochial schools, the Democratic Party, Indiana land claims, wood energy sources, the Education Department, women in positions of decision making, the board of the Federal Reserve, the Loring Air Force Base, abortion, Indian land claims, individual importance, student loan defaults, handicapped individuals, arm sales in the Middle East, malpractice insurance, Cyprus, the Equal Rights Amendment, and the oil suppliers.
- February 18 – While in the gymnasium at the Nashua Senior High School in Nashua, New Hampshire, President Carter answers questions on the coal strike, federal civil service reduction, Middle East arm sales, tax reductions and the budget, national health care, his campaign promises, nuclear power plants, government standards, national energy plan, the coal strike, his religious beliefs, foreign assistance, education, his participation in town meetings, Governor Thompson, tuition tax credits, and the Panama Canal treaties.
- February 18 – President Carter declares the existence of "a regional energy emergency" in Kentucky and states that its severity may require the effects of a temporary suspension of certain particulate and sulfur dioxide control regulations.
- February 20 – President Carter signs S. 1360 into law which he says "provides the Secretary of Agriculture broad flexibility in determining bidding methods to be used in the sale of National Forest timber."
- February 20 – President Carter attends a fundraising dinner for Senator Joe Biden in the Gold Ballroom at the Hotel Dupont.
- February 20 – President Carter attends a Delaware Democratic Committee dinner at the Padua Academy in Wilmington, Delaware.
- February 21 – President Carter meets with Prime Minister of Denmark Anker Jørgensen in the White House for reviews on "economic trends in their two countries, in the West generally, and in the world."
- February 21 – President Carter announces the nomination of Manuel A. Sanchez, Jr. for Superintendent of the United States Assay Office at New York.
- February 22 – In a message to Congress, President Carter submits legislation that if enacted will extend the Comprehensive Employment and Training Act through 1982.
- February 22 – President Carter attends a White House dinner for retiring members of Congress in the East Room.
- February 23 – President Carter transmits four human rights treaties to the Senate for ratification. President Carter notes the United States is one of few countries that has not entered any of the three human rights treaties of the United Nations and a continued failure to do so "increasingly reflects upon our attainments, and prejudices United States participation in the development of the international law of human rights."
- February 23 – William H. Webster is sworn in as the 3rd Director of the Federal Bureau of Investigation in the auditorium of the J. Edgar Hoover F.B.I. Building.
- February 23 – President Carter announces the Reorganization Plan No. 1 of 1978 in the East Room, stating his belief that it is "the single most important action to improve civil rights in the last decade" and says it will establish the Equal Employment Opportunity Commission to enforce equal employment opportunity.
- February 23 – President Carter submits Reorganization Plan No. 1 of 1978 to Congress. Carter says the plan's enactment would make the enforcement of fair employment primarily done by the Equal Employment Opportunity Commission and would set "the foundation of a unified, coherent Federal structure to combat job discrimination in all its forms."
- February 23 – In a message to Congress, President Carter reports "a new Department of Commerce deferral of Maritime Administration funds totalling $122 million in budget authority and a new deferral of $0.4 million in outlays for the Antirecession financial assistance fund in the Department of the Treasury."
- February 23 – President Carter announces the appointment of seven individuals for membership on the President's Committee on Mental Retardation.
- February 23 – President Carter announces the nomination of H. William Menard for director of the Geological Survey.
- February 23 – President Carter announces the nomination of Shallie M. Bey, Jr. for Superintendent of the U.S. Mint at Philadelphia.
- February 23 – President Carter announces the appointment of five individuals for membership the Board of Foreign Scholarships.
- February 23 – President Carter announces the appointment of Leila L. Botts for chairman of the Great Lakes Basin Commission.
- February 23 – President Carter announces the appointments of five individuals for membership on the Committee for Purchase from the Blind and Other Severely Handicapped.
- February 24 – President Carter signs the Endangered American Wilderness Act of 1978 into law during a signing ceremony in the Cabinet Room. Carter says the legislation "will add about 1.3 million acres in 10 Western States to the wilderness areas of our country, expanding 4 existing wilderness areas and adding 13 new areas at this time" in addition to representing "the largest single addition to the wilderness areas of our country since the original enactment of the wilderness act in 1964".
- February 24 – In a statement, President Carter declares the existence of "a regional energy emergency" and states the possible necessity of a temporary suspension of certain particulate and sulfur dioxide control regulations under the Pennsylvania Air Quality Implementation Plan as well as admitting the potential inadequacies of other ways of responding to the energy emergency.
- February 24 – President Carter announces the appointment of seven individuals for membership on the Federal Service Impasses Panel.
- February 24 – President Carter signs Executive Order 12040, regarding environmental evaluation functions.
- February 24 – During an evening Briefing Room appearance, President Carter announces "the United Mine Workers and the coal operators have agreed to a negotiated settlement of their contrast dispute."
- February 24 – President Carter attends a White House reception for acquaintances from New Hampshire in the East Room.
- February 25 – President Carter signs Executive Order 12041, an amendment to the generalized system of preferences.
- February 27 – President Carter announces the appointment of Abraham D. Beame as chairman of the Advisory Commission on Intergovernmental Relations.
- February 27 – President Carter transmits the twelfth quarterly report of the Council on Wage and Price Stability to Congress in a message.
- February 28 – During an appearance in the Briefing Room, Carter states his asking of Congress to assist with the creation of an education department, his proposal for "a plan to Congress that would make financial help available each year to 2 million more college students than are now eligible", and his sending of legislative proposals to reshape elementary and secondary education programs.
- February 28 – President Carter transmits administration proposals on major elementary and secondary education programs, saying they "seek to enhance the primary role of the states and local communities in educating our Nation's children and reaffirm the need for a strong and supportive Federal commitment to education."
- February 28 – President Carter transmits the Agreement between the United States of America and the Italian Republic on the Matter of Social Security to Congress in a message.
- February 28 – President Carter transmits a report on the Council on Environmental Quality to Congress in a message.
- February 28 – President Carter attends a White House reception for the National Governors' Conference in the East Room.

== March ==
- March 1 – National Security Advisor Zbigniew Brzezinski warns "unwanted intrusion" in the conflict between Ethiopia and Somalia would impose complications to a new US and Soviet Union arms treaty and it potentially being ratified in the Senate.
- March 1 – President Carter signs legislation enabling coals miners to have eligibility for payments on black lungs during a White House ceremony.
- March 10 – President Carter signs the Nuclear Non-Proliferation Act of 1978 into law during a morning ceremony in the Cabinet Room. President Carter says the legislation "will give guidance to me, to the Congress, to the Nuclear Regulatory Commission, and to the Department of Energy and other agencies in our Federal Government who deal with this very sensitive subject."
- March 10 – President Carter reports a deferral from the Department of Agriculture of Forest Service funds that total $4.5 million in budget authority in a message to Congress.
- March 10 – President Carter meets with Defense Minister of Israel Ezer Weizman during the afternoon "for an exchange of views on the security situation in the Middle East and the status of the current peace negotiations."
- March 13 – In a statement, President Carter declares the existence of "a regional energy emergency" in Ohio of enough severity to warrant the temporary suspension of various particulate control regulations under the Ohio Air Quality Implementation Plan.
- March 16 – In a vote of 68 to 32, the Senate narrowly votes to ratify the Carter administration-backed Panama Canal neutrality treaty. President Carter addresses the vote during an appearance in the White House Press Room, stating his confidence that the Senate will vote the following month to approve the canal being turned over to the Panama.
- March 27 – President Carter signs H.R. 3813 into law. President Carter says the legislation serves as an expansion of Redwood National Park boundaries in California and it sees the fruition of a part of his environmental message to Congress the previous year.
- March 27 – President Carter announces the nomination of George S. Benton for Associate Administrator of the National Oceanic and Atmospheric Administration (NOAA).
- March 27 – President Carter transmits the 1975 Annual Report of Health Activities under the Federal Coal Mine Health and Safety Act of 1969 to Congress in a message.
- March 27 – President Carter transmits the sixth annual report on the status of advisory committees to Congress in a message.
- March 27 – President Carter transmits his proposal for a comprehensive national urban policy to Congress in a message, saying its implementation "will build a New Partnership involving all levels of government, the private sector, and neighborhood and voluntary organizations in a major effort to make America's cities better places in which to live and work."
- March 27 – President Carter issues a memorandum to department and agency leadership on the subject of defense economic adjustment programs, stating his commitment to "a reduction in Defense costs, but the burden should not be borne solely by the citizens who happen to reside or work in an impacted area" and "the implementation of these changes in a manner that reflects my genuine concern for those individuals and communities that are directly affected."
- March 27 – President Carter announces the nomination of Anita M. Miller for membership on the board of trustees of the Harry S Truman Scholarship Foundation.
- March 27 – President Carter issues a memorandum to the Special Representative for Trade Negotiations on the subject of citizens band (CB) radio transceivers.
- March 27 – President Carter issues a statement declaring his belief in the existence of "a regional energy emergency" in Pennsylvania that warrants temporary suspension of various particulate and sulfur dioxide control regulations by the Pennsylvania Air Quality Implementation Plan may be of necessity.
- March 28 – In a statement, President Carter says his signing of Executive Order 12046 was intended to "implement the portion of my Executive Office reorganization plan that abolishes the Office of Telecommunications Policy" and concurrently reduces "the size of the Executive Office, this reorganization will enhance the administration's ability to exercise leadership in communications policy."
- March 28 – President Carter announces "the number of Federal advisory committees dropped last year to 875, the lowest since the Government started keeping close track of such groups."
- March 29–31 – President Carter and First Lady Rosalynn Carter tour Brazil in what is said by the White House to be a testimony to the desires of both President Carter and President of Brazil Ernesto Geisel "to increase their mutual understanding and build on the broad areas of agreement that exist between the two Governments."
- March 29 – President Carter attends his welcoming ceremony at the Aeroporto Militar in Brasilia.
- March 30 – President Carter holds his twenty-eighth news conference in the Ballroom of the Hotel Nacional in Brasilla, answering questions on relations between the United States and Brazil, the Middle East, American commercial bank loans to Brazil, free enterprise and human rights, Namibia, nuclear energy and proliferation, Prime Minister Menachem Begin, his future meetings in Brazil, inflation, General Figueiredo, steel prices, Brazilian political process and human rights, and Middle East visit possibilities.
- March 30 – President Carter delivers an address to the Brazilian Congress in the Chamber of Deputies of the Congress in Brasilia, Brazil.

== April ==
- April 1 – President Carter attends a welcoming ceremony at Dodan Barracks in Lagos, Nigeria.
- April 1 – President Carter delivers remarks at the National Arts Theatre in Lagos on relations between the United States and Nigeria.
- April 2 – President Carter answers questions on South Africa policy, American investments and assistance to Nigeria, embargoes against South Africa, cooperation between the US and Nigeria, Zimbabwe and Namibia meetings, value of the dollar, and human rights at the State House Marina in Laos.
- April 3 – Secretary of State Vance answers questions from reporters on international issues while boarding Air Force One.
- April 3 – President Carter attends a welcoming ceremony at Roberts International Airport in Monrovia, Liberia.
- April 3 – President Carter attends a working luncheon in the Presidential Dining Room at the Executive Mansion in Monrovia.
- April 3 – President Carter and Vice President Mondale make a joint appearance on the South Lawn and address President Carter's Latin America and Africa trips.
- April 4 – President Carter issues Executive Order 12050, establishing a National Advisory Committee for Women "in order to promote equality for women in the cultural, social, economic and political life of this Nation".
- April 4 – President Carter announces the nomination of Robert J. Sugarman for commissioner on the part of the United States on the International Joint Commission—United States and Canada.
- April 4 – In a statement, President Carter notes the ten years that have passed since the passage of the National Fair Housing Law and calling "upon those in Federal, State and local government-and all who are directly involved in the housing industry and real estate profession-to intensify those efforts that promote fair housing."
- April 5 – President Carter signs Proclamation 4559, modifying the process of importing alloy tool steel into the United States.
- April 5 – President Carter announces the nominations of David C. Jones for Chairman of the Joint Chiefs of Staff, Lew Allen, Jr. as Chief of Staff of the United States Air Force, and Thomas B. Hayward as Chief of Naval Operations.
- April 5 – President Carter attends a White House reception for the Communications Workers of America in the East Room.
- April 5 – President Carter announces the nomination of William E. Albers for Alternate Federal Cochairman of the Appalachian Regional Commission.
- April 5 – President Carter participates in an interview for Black Perspective in the Map Room, answering questions on his trip to Africa, national urban policy, support from African-Americans, his views on the presidency, reverse discrimination, the Humphrey-Hawkins bill, administration programs, foreign relations of the United States, and human rights.
- April 5 – In a letter to Wisconsin Senator Gaylord Nelson, President Carter states his intent "to call a White House Conference on Small Business, as suggested by Senate Resolution 105 which you authored."
- April 6 – President Carter announces the appointments of twenty-six individuals for membership on the Commission on Presidential Scholars.
- April 6 – President Carter announces the appointment of four individuals for membership on the National Commission for Manpower Policy.
- April 6 – President Carter announces the nomination of Margaret A. Brewer for appointment to the grade of brigadier general.
- April 27 – The Carter administration releases a report on areas of waste along with inefficiency regarding the $500 million spent on these programs annually in addition to an announcement of steps on increasing the effectiveness of expenditures.
- April 27 – President Carter presents the President's Environmental Youth Awards during a Cabinet Room ceremony.
- April 27 – President Carter issues a memorandum to department and agency leadership on the subject of his move "strengthening the White House Office of Consumer Affairs and increasing its responsibilities."
- April 27 – President Carter transmits "an Executive Order authorizing the export of 7,638 kg. of low-enriched uranium to India for use in the fueling of its Tarapur Atomic Power Station" to Congress in a message.
- April 27 – President Carter signs Executive Order 12055, authorizing the export of special nuclear material to India.
- April 28 – President Carter attends a planting ceremony for one of the Cedars of Lebanon at the Southwest Jefferson Mound on the South Grounds.
- April 28 – President Carter announces the nomination of Francis H. McAdams for reappointment to membership on the National Transportation Safety Board.
- April 28 – President Carter transmits a proposed constitution for the Territory of Guam to Congress in a message.
- April 28 – President Carter attends a White House reception for the National Federation of Democratic Women in the East Room.
- April 28 – President Carter signs Executive Order 12056, granting Civil Aeronautics Board member G. Joseph Minetti exemption from mandatory requirement.
- April 28 – Secretary of State Vance announces the Carter administration is sending Congress a "formal notification of proposals to sell aircraft to Israel, Egypt, and Saudi Arabia" and adds they are essential to the administration's attempts to secure peace in the Middle East.
- April 28 – President Carter delivers an address on administration policies and answers questions on timber production, his trip to Colorado, arm sales in the Middle East, the United States Navy budget, the energy shortage, Japan oil sales, and his relationship with Western states and his trips there during a Cabinet Room appearance.

== May ==
- May 1 – President Carter transmits the Reciprocal Fisheries Agreement for 1978 between the Government of the United States and the Government of Canada to Congress in a message.
- May 2 – President Carter transmits the annual report of the Federal Council on Aging in accordance with Section 205 (f) of the Older Americans Act (P.L. 93-29) to Congress in a message.
- May 2 – President Carter attends the National Small Business Person of the Year award ceremony in the Rose Garden.
- May 2 – President Carter announces the nomination of Richard F. Kneip for Ambassador Extraordinary and Plenipotentiary of the United States to the Republic of Singapore.
- May 2 – President Carter announces the appointment of John R. Ehrenfeld for chairman of the New England River Basins Commission.
- May 2 – President Carter issues a statement on the observance of Better Hearing and Speech Month, saying he wants "to take the opportunity to applaud the individuals and groups who are involved in community activities relating to improved health, rehabilitation and social care for those with communicative disorders."
- May 2 – President Carter issues a statement on the observance of National Nursing Home Week, expressing his interest in paying tribute to individuals providing service in nursing homes.
- May 3 – President Carter announces the reappointment of Jerome M. Rosow for chairman of the advisory committee on Federal Pay.
- May 3 – President Carter signs the White House Conferences on the Arts and Humanities Act into law. In expressing his reservations to portions of the bill, Carter says "conducting separate conferences in arts and humanities would involve unnecessary expense and duplication and would miss an opportunity for a far more productive exchange of views and experiences among persons deeply concerned with our cultural life."
- May 3 – President Carter tours Solar Energy Research Institute on South Table Mountain in Golden, Colorado.
- May 3 – President Carter attends a fundraising reception for Senator Floyd K. Haskell at the Currigan Exhibition Center in Denver, Colorado.
- May 4 – President Carter attends the Governor's Annual Prayer Breakfast at the Currigan Exhibition Center in Denver.
- May 4 – President Carter attends a morning meeting with environmental, community, and governmental leaders in the Broadway Arms Room at the Cosmopolitan Hotel in Denver.
- May 4 – President Carter attends a luncheon commemorating the centennial of the Los Angeles County Bar Association at the Dorothy Chandler Pavilion of the Los Angeles Music Center in Los Angeles, California.
- May 4 – President Carter delivers an address to the Senior Citizens Nutrition Center of the Watts Labor Community Action Committee at the Bradley Multi-Purpose Center in Los Angeles.
- May 4 – President Carter holds his thirty-first news conference in the Ballroom of the Portland Hilton Hotel in Portland, Oregon. President Carter begins the conference with an address on federal civil service reform and answers questions on timber production, forest service personnel, his income taxes, nuclear wastes disposal, nuclear power plant siting, his campaigning for Democrats, the national water policy, arm sales in the Middle East, inflation, Indian land claims, Angola, his popularity in polls, and strategic arms limitation.
- May 4 – President Carter attends a reception for community leaders in the Pavilion Room at the Portland Hilton Hotel in Portland.
- May 5 – President Carter attends the dedication ceremony for the Riverfront Park in Spokane, Washington.
- May 5 – At a town hall at the Spokane Convention Center, President Carter delivers an address on administration policies and answers questions on tax reduction and reform, peace negotiations and arms sales in the Middle East, the Social Security system, tuition tax credits, solar energy, home ownership, Soviet involvement in Africa, criminal justice system, enhanced radiation weapons, national health care, oil surpluses, mental health programs, and Canada.
- May 5 – President Carter issues a statement on the anniversary of the 1862 victory at Puebla, Mexico against the French, requesting "all Americans to join me in extending to our fellow citizens of Mexican heritage warmest greetings for a joyous and festive cinco de mayo!"
- May 6 – In a statement, President Carter announces "the reorganization plan I submitted in February goes into effect today" and touts that it "will improve enforcement of equal employment opportunities and reduce the burden of equal employment enforcement on business by consolidating the number of agencies involved in this area."
- May 8 – President Carter signs Executive Order 12057, an expansion in membership of the National Advisory Committee for Women.
- May 8 – President Carter announces the nomination of Duane C. Sewell for Assistant Secretary of Energy for Defense Programs.
- May 17 – President Carter attends the dedication ceremony for President of Zambia Kenneth D. Kaunda in the East Room.
- May 17 – President Carter announces the nominations of individuals for representatives and alternate representatives of the United States to the 10th Special Session of the United Nations Devoted to Disarmament.
- May 17 – President Carter announces the nominations of three individuals for membership on the Federal Farm Credit Board.
- May 18 – President Carter meets with senior representatives of the departments and agencies who are slated to assist administrator of the Agency for International Development John Gilligan in coordination of all foreign aid programs.
- May 19 – President Carter issues Proclamation 4572, a designation of May 29 as "Memorial Day" and that "the hour beginning in each locality at 11 o'clock on the morning of that day as the appropriate time for the American people to unite in prayer."
- May 19 – In a statement, President Carter says he is "seriously concerned about events surrounding the election in the Dominican Republic" and confirms his communication with presidents of neighboring countries in Latin American as well as the secretary general for discussions on election procedures.
- May 19 – In a letter to the National Association of Theatre Owners, President Carter expresses the willingness of the Washington-based National Architectural and Transportation Compliance Board to give both information and tips on increasing the accessibility of theaters to the physically handicapped.
- May 19 – President Carter delivers an address on administration policies and answers questions on the trial of Yuri Orlov, nuclear power, the Equal Rights Amendment, Cuban and Soviet involvement in Africa, natural gas deregulation, the Dominican Republic, China, relations with Congress, and soil and water conservation while in the Cabinet Room.
- May 20 – President Carter attends the White House reception for members of Congress and their families on the South Grounds.
- May 21 – President Carter answers questions on the Zaire operation at Peterson Field in Plains.
- May 22 – President Carter delivers an address to Tennessee Valley Authority employees in the auditorium of the Civic Coliseum in Knoxville, Tennessee.
- May 22 – President Carter delivers remarks on the environment to Oak Ridge National Laboratory Scientists in the Central Auditorium at the Oak Ridge National Laboratory Headquarters.
- May 23 – President Carter presents the 1977 Presidential Management Improvement Awards in the Rose Garden.
- May 23 – President Carter submits another part of the administration's proposal at Federal personnel management system reform through Reorganization Plan No. 2 of 1978 to Congress in a message.
- May 23 – President Carter issues a memorandum to the secretary of state on the subject of authorizing the obligation of $750,000 of funds allowed for availability by the United States Emergency Refugee and Migration Assistance Fund.
- May 23 – President Carter attends a White House meeting on the Private Sector Initiative Program in the East Room.
- May 23 – In a letter to members of the House Interstate and Foreign Commerce Committee, President Carter writes that the "most important immediate step this Nation can take to hold down the intolerable rise in health costs is to pass legislation containing hospital costs" and urges the committee "to help bring spiralling health care costs back in line with the rest of the economy by passing that legislation at your forthcoming markup."
- May 24 – President Carter transmits the Additional Protocol I to the Treaty for the Prohibition of Nuclear Weapons in Latin America to the Senate for ratification in a message.
- May 24 – In a letter to the Speaker of the House and President of the Senate, President Carter transmits a bill intended to establish a National Commission on the International Year of the Child.
- May 24 – President and First Lady Carter attend the unveiling ceremony for the official portraits of former president Gerald Ford and former First Lady Betty Ford in the East Room.
- May 24 – President Carter attends a White House reception for the United Service Organizations in the East Room.
- May 24 – In a statement, President Carter announces "that the congressional energy conferees, after 6 months of arduous work, have reached final agreement on natural gas legislation."
- May 25 – President Carter announces the appointment of seven individuals for membership on the President's Commission on Personnel Interchange.
- May 25 – President Carter attends the presentation ceremony for the 1978 Presidential Scholars Medallions in the Rose Garden.
- May 25 – President Carter announces the nomination of Robert Pitofsky for membership on the Federal Trade Commission.
- May 25 – President Carter announces three individuals for membership on the Federal Mine Safety and Health Review Commission.
- May 25 – President Carter holds his thirty-second news conference in the Crystal Ballroom at the Blackstone Hotel. President Carter begins with an address on American foreign assistance programs and answers questions from reporters on the Humphrey-Hawkins bill, the Soviet Union and SALT negotiations, military installations in Illinois, his relationship with Illinois Democrats, canal fees, inflation, communism and Africa, and views on his presidency.
- May 25 – President Carter attends the 1978 Cook County Democratic Dinner in Chicago Illinois.
- May 26 – In the house chamber at the State Capitol Building, President Carter delivers an address on administration policies and answers questions on labor law reform, the social security system, relations between the United States and Israel, labor law reform, and urban unemployment.
- May 26 – President Carter attends a fundraising breakfast for gubernatorial candidate Michael Bakalis in the Lincoln Room at the Holiday Inn East in Springfield, Illinois.
- May 26 – President Carter attends a fundraising reception for West Virginia Senator Jennings Randolph in the West Virginia Room at the Charleston Civic Center in Charleston, West Virginia.
- May 26 – President Carter announces the establishment of the President's Commission on the Coal Industry in the Little Theater at the Charleston Civic Center in Charleston, West Virginia.
- May 26 – President Carter signs Executive Order 12062, intended to establish "a balanced forum to review the state of the Nation's coal industry".
- May 26 – President Carter announces the nomination of Warren D. Manshel for Ambassador Extraordinary and Plenipotentiary of the United States to Denmark.
- May 26 – President Carter meets with President of France Giscard d'Estaing during the evening for discussions on "international issues affecting their two countries, including East-West relations, the forthcoming seven-nation summit in Bonn this July, and the Middle East."
- May 30 – President Carter signs H.R. 10392 into law, establishing the Hubert H. Humphrey Fellowship at the Woodrow Wilson International Center for Scholars.
- May 30 – President Carter delivers remarks at the opening ceremonies of the North Atlantic Alliance Summit in the Concert Hall at the John F. Kennedy Center for the Performing Arts.
- May 30 – President Carter signs a joint resolution affirming American commitment to the North Atlantic Alliance.
- May 30 – President Carter issues Proclamation 4573, calling on Americans to observe "Flag Day" on June 14, 1978, and "National Flag Week" during the week beginning June 11, 1978 in addition to directing "the appropriate officials of the Government to display the flag on all Government buildings during that week and ask the American people to display our flag at their homes and other suitable places for the same period."
- May 30 – President Carter meets with Chancellor of Germany Helmut Schmidt at the White House for a morning review on international issues.
- May 30 – President Carter attends a Rose Garden dinner honoring the heads of the delegation to the North Atlantic Alliance Summit.
- May 31 – President Carter meets with Prime Minister of Turkey Bulent Ecevit during the morning for an hour long discussion on international issues including Turkey's place in the NATO alliance.
- May 31 – President Carter holds a morning meeting with Prime Minister of Italy Giulio Andreotti for discussions on "certain world issues, Alliance questions, and recent developments in both countries" in addition to a review on "joint initiatives to enhance the relationship between Italy and the United States decided upon during the Prime Minister's visit to Washington in July 1977."
- May 31 – President Carter delivers remarks to the North Atlantic Alliance Summit on the subject of NATO defense policy in the Loy Henderson Conference Room at the State Department.
- May 31 – President Carter meets with President of Portugal Antonio dos Santos Ramalho Eanes for discussions on "a wide range of political, economic, and security issues in which the two nations share an interest."
- May 31 – President Carter announces the nomination of Adolph Dubs for Ambassador Extraordinary and Plenipotentiary of the United States to Afghanistan.
- May 31 – President Carter announces the nomination of Frederic L. Chapin for Ambassador Extraordinary and Plenipotentiary of the United States to Ethiopia.
- May 31 – President Carter announces the nomination of William H. Gleysteen, Jr. for Ambassador Extraordinary and Plenipotentiary of the United States to the Republic of Korea.
- May 31 – In a statement, President Carter urges the public to give feedback on the effectiveness of "the new procedures" introduced in Executive Order 12044.
- May 31 – President Carter delivers an address on the contents of the discussions of the North Atlantic Alliance Summit to reporters assembled in the Dean Acheson Room at the State Department.
- May 31 – President Carter meets with Prime Minister of Greece Constantine Caramanlis at the White House for an hour long discussion on the "entire range of issues regarding Greek-U.S. relations, the situation in the Eastern Mediterranean, and NATO."

== June ==
- June 1 – President Carter announces the appointment of the 1978–79 White House Fellows.
- June 1 – President Carter attends the dedication ceremonies for the East Building of the National Gallery of Art.
- June 2 – President Carter delivers remarks on strategic arms limitations to reporters in the Oval Office.
- June 2 – President Carter issues a statement on the death of Alabama Senator James B. Allen who he calls "one of the great masters of parliamentary procedure in the long tradition of Southern Senators."
- June 2 – President Carter announces the nomination of Raymond E. Gonzalez for Ambassador Extraordinary and Plenipotentiary of the United States to Ecuador.
- June 2 – President Carter announces the nomination of Morton I. Abramowitz for Ambassador Extraordinary and Plenipotentiary of the United States to Thailand.
- June 2 – President Carter announces the appointments of three individuals for membership on the Advisory Committee for Trade Negotiation.
- June 2 – President Carter transmits the Occupational Safety and Health Activities in the Federal Government report to Congress in a message.
- June 6 – President Carter releases a statement on the observance of the tenth anniversary of the assassination of Robert F. Kennedy.
- June 7 – President Carter delivers an address at the United States Naval Academy during commencement exercises in the Navy-Marine Corps Memorial Stadium.
- June 7 – In a statement, President Carter notes the day will see "the members of the House Commerce Committee will make their most important anti-inflation decision of this congressional session—whether to vote for a bill which will contain skyrocketing hospital costs" and calls for them to approve the measure.
- June 8 – President Carter attends a White House meeting of the Community Investment Fund Program in Room 450 of the Old Executive Office Building.
- June 8 – President Carter announces the nomination of Viron P. Vaky for Assistant Secretary of State for Inter-American Affairs.
- June 8 – President Carter announces the nomination of James W. Haas for membership on the Advisory Council on Historic Preservation.
- June 8 – President Carter delivers an address on the administration's anti-inflation policy while speaking to reporters in the Briefing Room.
- June 9 – President Carter delivers an address at the National Council of Senior Citizens Convention in the International Ballroom of the Washington Hilton Hotel.
- June 9 – President Carter signs Proclamation 4574, requesting the observation of Father's Day on June 18, 1978, in addition to directing "Government officials to display the flag of the United States on all Government buildings on that day and I urge all citizens to display the flag at their homes and other suitable places."
- June 9 – President Carter issues a memorandum to department and agency leadership on the subject of the Government in the Sunshine Act, noting that in his attempts to comply with the act, he has "asked the Director of the Office of Management and Budget to record the number of meetings subject to the Act, to note whether those meetings are open or closed, and if closed, to state the reason for closing them."
- June 9 – President Carter announces the nomination of Bruce P. Johnson for membership on the United States Metric Board.
- June 12 – President Carter announces the nomination of Oliver J. Keller, Jr. for Commissioner of the United States Parole Commission.
- June 14 – President Carter announces the nomination of James P. Wade, Jr. for chairman of the Military Liaison Committee to the Department of Energy.
- June 14 – President Carter announces the nomination of Geri M. Joseph for Ambassador Extraordinary and Plenipotentiary of the United States to The Netherlands.
- June 18 – In a statement, President Carter expresses content with the House of Representatives voting in favor of guarantee legislation to meet the financial needs of New York City.
- June 19 – President Carter transmits the Reorganization Plan No. 3 of 1978 to Congress in a message, saying the plan will improve federal emergency management and assistance as well as reduce "duplicative administrative costs and strengthens our ability to deal effectively with emergencies."
- June 19 – President Carter vetoes H.R. 3161, citing his discontent with the bill being due to the measure's reduction on the work week of firefighters without reducing the premium pay intended for a longer standby schedule in addition to charging it with impairing "the ability of agency heads to manage the work force and regulate the work week" and the requirement of the Defense Department to hire another 4,600 employees to keep up with protection from fires.
- June 20 – President Carter announces the appointment of forty individuals for membership on the National Advisory Committee for Women in addition to Bella Abzug and Carmen Votaw serving as co-chairpersons of the committee and Judy Carter as honorary chairperson.
- June 21 – President Carter issues a statement on the observance of Independence Day.
- June 21 – President Carter announces the appointment of the twenty-two individuals for membership on the National Commission for the Review of Antitrust Laws and Procedures.
- June 21 – President Carter delivers an address to members of the National Commission for the Review of Antitrust Laws and Procedures in the Rose Garden.
- June 21 – President Carter delivers remarks at the opening session of the eighth general assembly of the Organization of American States in the Hall of the Americas at the Pan American Union Building.
- June 21 – President Carter sends Congress a message on the history and implementation of the legislative veto.
- June 21 – President Carter attends a White House reception for the Lawyers' Committee for Civil Rights Under Law in the East Room.
- June 22 – President Carter transmits a plan for a National Earthquake Hazards Reduction Program to Congress in a message, saying it deals with "predicting and preparing for earthquakes; ways in which government, industry, and the public can apply knowledge of seismic risk when making land-use decisions; and achieving earthquake-resistant design and construction."
- June 23 – President Carter sends a report to Congress on progress made toward obtaining a negotiated settlement in Cyprus in a message.
- June 28 - President Carter appoints seven individuals, including Detroit Tigers centerfielder Ron LeFlore and Kenneth McClintock-Hernandez to the National Advisory Committee on Juvenile Justice and Delinquency Prevention
- June 30 – President Carter announces the nomination of Edward S. Smith for Associate Judge of the United States Court of Claims.
- June 30 – President Carter attends an afternoon ceremony honoring Chairman of the Joint Chiefs of Staff David C. Jones, Chief of Staff of the United States Air Force Lew Allen, and Chief of Naval Operations Thomas B. Hayward on the River Entrance Plaza at the Pentagon.
- June 30 – President Carter signs Executive Order 12070, amending the suspension of applicable requirements and administrative matters for the purpose of authorizing "the temporary restoration of the cost of living allowance to certain employees".
- June 30 – President Carter signs Proclamation 4576, a proclamation of July 1, 1978, as "Free Enterprise Day".
- June 30 – President Carter participates in an interview in the Cabinet Room, beginning with an address on various administration policies and answers questions on the Middle East, his accessibility to the public, tax reduction, capital gains taxation, affirmative action programs, nuclear power, human rights, and inflation.
- June 30 – In a memorandum to department and agency leadership, President Carter announces the decision of United States Secretary of Health, Education, and Welfare Joseph A. Califano to serve as chairman of the Combined Federal Campaign for the National Capital Area during the upcoming fall.
- June 30 – President Carter issues a memorandum to department and agency leadership on ways they can support the Combined Federal Campaign and the positive ramifications of doing so.

== July ==
- July 12 – President Carter announces the nomination of Stanley R. Resor for Under Secretary of Defense for Policy.
- July 12 – President Carter announces the nomination of George M. Lane for Ambassador Extraordinary and Plenipotentiary of the United States to the Yemen Arab Republic.
- July 12 – President Carter announces the appointment of George Chaplin for United States Alternate Representative on the South Pacific Commission.
- July 12 – In a letter to the House Judiciary Committee, President Carter notes the upcoming Judiciary Committee vote on H.J. Res. 638, which would lengthen the time for ratification of the Equal Rights Amendment. President Carter states his "strong support for an extension of the deadline beyond March 22, 1979."
- July 13 – President Carter and Vice President Mondale deliver remarks on the former's trip to Germany on the South Grounds.
- July 13 – President Carter announces the nomination of Ruth C. Clusen for Assistant Secretary of Energy.
- July 13 – President Carter announces the nomination of Roger A. Markle for director of the Bureau of Mines at the Interior Department.
- July 13 – President Carter announces the nomination of William K. Smith for chairman of the board of directors of the United States Railway Association.
- July 13 – President Carter announces the nomination of Gloria Schaffer for membership on the Civil Aeronautics Board.
- July 13 – President Carter announces the nomination of Jane Hurt Yarn for membership on the Council on Environmental Quality.
- July 13 – President Carter announces the nomination of Richard V. Backley for membership on the Federal Mine Safety and Health Review Commission.

== September ==
- September 17 – The Camp David Accords are signed by Egyptian President Anwar El Sadat and Israeli Prime Minister Menachem Begin, following twelve days of secret negotiations at Camp David.

== November ==
- November 1 – President Carter signs Executive Order 12093, establishing the President's Commission on the Holocaust.
- November 1 – President Carter announces the appointment of John P. White for deputy director of the Office of Management and Budget.
- November 1 – President Carter signs the Contract Disputes Act of 1978 into law. President Carter says the legislation "will provide a much more logical and flexible means of resolving contract disputes. It should lead to savings for Federal agencies and their contractors."
- November 1 – President Carter signs Executive Order 12094, regarding the special pay for sea duty.
- November 2 – President Carter signs Executive Order 12095, establishing "a board of three members to be appointed by the President to investigate" to dispute between the Wien Air Alaska, Inc. and the Air Line Pilots Association.
- November 2 – President Carter signs Executive Order 12096, fixing compensation for officials in the Commerce Department.
- November 2 – In a memorandum, President Carter states his reasons for vetoing the Navajo and Hopi Relocation Amendments of 1978. Carter states his disapproval of the measure centers on the provision in section 4 providing a one house veto of the relocation plan which is finally adopted by the Relocation Commission.
- November 20 – In the Briefing Room, Press Secretary Jody Powell says President Carter "wishes to express his deepest condolences to the families of Don Harris and Robert Brown, of the National Broadcasting Corporation, and Gregory Robinson, of the San Francisco Examiner" in the wake of their deaths.
- November 20 – President Carter releases a statement commemorating the anniversary of the National Women's Conference.
- November 22 – President Carter announces the appointment of Wayne E. Glenn for membership on the Advisory Committee for Trade Negotiations.
- November 22 – President Carter announces the appointment of two individuals for membership on the Committee for Purchase from the Blind and Other Severely Handicapped.
- November 22 – President Carter announces the appointment of Thomas H. Wyman for membership on the Presidential Commission on World Hunger.
- November 22 – President Carter announces the appointment of six individuals for membership on the President's Commission on Mental Retardation.
- November 22 – President Carter attends a White House dinner in observance of National Bible Week in the East Room.
- November 22 – In a letter to the Speaker of the House and President of the Senate, President Carter submits a report detailing his "determination that import relief for the U.S. Artificial Bait and Flies Industry is not in the national economic interest and explaining the reasons for my decision."
- November 22 – In a memorandum to department and agency leadership, President Carter says he has determined "that import relief would not be in the national economic interest."
- November 24 – In a statement, President Carter announces his acceptance of the resignation of Carolyn R. Payton as director of the Peace Corps.
- November 27 – President Carter attends the National League of Cities' 1978 Congress of Cities in Monsanto Hall at the Cervantes Convention Center during the morning.
- November 27 – President Carter attends a briefing on the budget for the board of directors of the National League of Cities in Room 122 at the Cervantes Convention Center in St. Louis, Missouri, delivering remarks on the evolution of the relationship between the administration and members of the board and answering questions from those in attendance.
- November 27 – President Carter receives the Family Unity Award at the Mormon Tabernacle in Salt Lake City, Utah and delivers remarks.
- November 27 – President Carter issues a statement on the assassinations of San Francisco Mayor George Moscone and Supervisor Harvey Milk.
- November 27 – In a statement, President Carter says he has been asked by Governor of Utah Scott M. Matheson "to review the findings of earlier Federal studies in Utah on the effects of exposure to radioactive particles on health and to determine whether or not a more comprehensive study is indicated."
- November 27 – President Carter announces the appointment of nine individuals for membership on the American Battle Monuments Commission.
- November 28 – President Carter signs Proclamation 4609, proclaiming December 10, 1978, as "Human Rights Day" and December 15, 1978, as "Bill of Rights Day".
- November 29 – President Carter attends the South Lawn welcoming ceremony for President of Tunisia Hedi Nouira.
- November 29 – President Carter attends a White House briefing for the Democratic National Committee's executive committee and state chairpersons in the East Room.
- November 29 – In a statement on conventional arms transfer restraint, President Carter announces "for the first time a set of quantitative and qualitative standards by which arms transfer requests considered by this Government would be judged" and the American government "has kept its pledge to take the leadership in restraining arms sales."
- November 30 – President Carter proposes "rescission of $75,000 in unneeded funds appropriated to the Foreign Claims Settlement Commission" in a message to Congress.
- November 30 – President Carter holds his fortieth news conference in Room 450 of the Old Executive Office Building. President Carter answers questions from reporters on inflation, defense spending and weapon systems, China, the tax reduction bill, former president Richard Nixon, religious cults, peace negotiations between Egypt and Israel, the American economy, Soviet MIG's in Cuba, Iran, the Energy Department, Civil Service Reorganization, and the activities of intelligence agencies.
- November 30 – President Carter sends a report to Congress on the progression of the negotiations to the Cyprus issue in a message. President Carter reports the development of "a growing awareness, especially among the parties directly concerned, that the time is now ripe for determined action designed to break the Cyprus deadlock."
- November 30 – President Carter signs Proclamation 4610, a modification of quotas on various sugars, syrups, and molasses.

== December ==
- December 1 – President Carter announces the nomination of Jesse Hill, Jr. and Joan F. Tobin for membership on the board of directors of the Communications Satellite Corporation.
- December 4 – President Carter announces the nomination of Dale E. Hathaway to be the inaugural holder of the position of Under Secretary of Agriculture for International Affairs and Commodity Programs.
- December 4 – President Carter announces the appointment of William J. Stibravy for Deputy Representative of the United States on the Economic and Social Council of the United Nations.
- December 4 – President Carter issues a statement on the death of Congressman William A. Steiger, who he says the "energy, independence, and good humor" of will be missed among his Wisconsin constituents and various colleagues.
- December 5 – President Carter attends a White House meeting of the Hubert H. Humphrey North-South Scholarship Program in Room 450 of the Old Executive Office Building.
- December 20 – President Carter announces the appointment of Rodney E. Leonard for deputy director of the Office of Consumer Affairs.
- December 21 – President Carter announces the appointment of Billy M. Mills for membership on the President's Council on Physical Fitness and Sports.
- December 28 – President Carter signs Executive Order 12110, granting multiple advisory committees continued existence until December 31, 1980.
- December 30 – President Carter issues a memorandum to department and agency leadership on the subject of American relations with Taiwan. He gives a multitude of orders on the matter and states his intent to "submit to the Congress a request for legislation relative to non-governmental relationships between the American people and the people on Taiwan."

== See also ==
- Timeline of the Jimmy Carter presidency, for an index of the Carter presidency timeline articles

U.S. presidential administration timelines
Preceded by Carter presidency (1977)	Carter presidency (1978)	Succeeded by Carter presidency (1979)
