= Jimmy Carter 1976 presidential campaign =

American political campaign

Jimmy Carter for President 1976
- Campaign: 1976 Democratic primaries 1976 U.S. presidential election
- Candidate: Jimmy Carter; 76th Governor of Georgia (1971–1975); Walter Mondale; U.S. Senator from Minnesota (1964–1976)
- Affiliation: Democratic Party
- Status: Announced: December 12, 1974; Presumptive nominee: June 24, 1976; Official nominee: July 15, 1976; Election day: November 2, 1976; Projected victory: November 3, 1976; Certification: January 6, 1977; Inaugurated: January 20, 1977
- Headquarters: Plains, Georgia
- Key people: Hamilton Jordan (campaign manager) Patrick Caddell (pollster)
- Slogan(s): Why not the Best? Not Just Peanuts; A Leader, for a Change (also "Leaders, for a Change"); Peaches And Cream; Grits & Fritz in '76
- Theme song: "Ode to the Georgia Farmer" by K.E. and Julia Marsh "Why Not the Best" by Oscar Brand

In the 1976 United States presidential election, Jimmy Carter and his running mate, Walter Mondale, were elected president and vice president, defeating incumbent Republican president Gerald Ford and his running mate, Bob Dole.

Carter, a Democrat and former governor of Georgia, launched his presidential bid in December 1974, as the Constitution of Georgia barred him from running for a second term as governor. In the wake of the Watergate scandal, the declining popularity of President Ford due to his highly controversial pardon of Nixon that damaged public trust in the presidency, and the severe 1973–1975 recession, many Democrats were sure of victory in the 1976 presidential election. As a result, 17 Democrats who were more widely known ran for their party's nomination in 1976. Carter's opponents mocked his candidacy by saying "Jimmy, who?", for him being relatively unknown outside Georgia. In response, Carter began saying "My name is Jimmy Carter, and I'm running for president." Carter extensively campaigned in the primaries, and in the end received 39.19% of his party's primary votes.

The 1976 Democratic National Convention was held at Madison Square Garden in New York City. Carter, after getting a sufficient number of delegates to be the nominee, shortlisted six possible vice presidential candidates and finally selected Mondale of Minnesota. While choosing Mondale, Carter emphasized Mondale's experience in Washington D.C. as he himself was a Southern "outsider". With President Ford's declining approval ratings, former California governor Ronald Reagan announced his candidacy for president, but Ford finally won the Republican nomination with 1,187 delegates to Reagan's 1,070.

The Carter campaign used various television advertisements that promised to bring back integrity and trust in the government after the Watergate scandal. Mondale and Rosalynn Carter, too, campaigned for the ticket in various states. The League of Women Voters decided to conduct debates between the presidential and vice-presidential candidates, to which both the campaigns agreed. In one of the presidential debates, while answering a question on the U.S. relationship with the Soviet Union and its influence in Europe, Ford said: "There is no Soviet domination of Eastern Europe and there never will be under a Ford administration." This gaffe likely damaged Ford's campaign. On election day, Carter carried 23 states with 297 electoral votes, while Ford won 27 states with 240 electoral votes. However, Ford left office with a 53 percent approval rating and 32 percent disapproval rating.

== Background ==
Jimmy Carter was born in Plains, Georgia, in 1924, to a family of traditional farmers. After his 1946 graduation from the United States Naval Academy, he served on submarines in the United States Navy but resigned in 1953 at the rank of Lieutenant after the unexpected death of his father and moved back to Plains with his wife Rosalynn and the rest of his family where he established a highly successful peanut farm business. In 1962 Carter embarked on his political career as a write-in candidate for the Georgia State Senate and won the 14th district seat. He served two terms in the state senate before he resigned in 1966 and was succeeded by his cousin Hugh Carter. He contested the Georgia Democratic gubernatorial primary in 1966 but lost the race to Ellis Arnall, coming in third place. The Democratic nominee Lester Maddox won the election. Carter ran again in the 1970 gubernatorial primaries. Governor Maddox was prohibited by the Georgia state constitution from running for reelection, so former governor Carl E. Sanders was Carter's main opponent in the primaries. With 49.62% of the primary vote, Carter was leading Sanders, who had 37.77% of the vote. Both of them qualified for a separate primary runoff election, which Carter won with approximately 160,000 more votes than Sanders.

Carter ran on a populist platform against Hal Suit, the Republican nominee. Carter had the support of many regular Democrats, such as former representative Carl Vinson, Senator Richard B. Russell, and Governor Maddox. Carter called for an end to busing as a means to control racial segregation in public and private schools, believing that to win the election he would have to get the votes of whites who were uneasy about integration. Consequently, he limited his campaign appearances before African American groups, while seeking both the black vote and the "Wallace vote".

On November 3, 1970, Carter won the Georgia governorship by an almost 20 percent margin. During his tenure as governor, he served on the National Governors' Conference's executive committee. He was also the campaign chairman for the Democratic National Committee in the 1974 congressional midterm elections. As governor, he signed a revised death-penalty statute that re-introduced that criminal penalty in the state. Another significant achievement was managing to successfully reduce state bureaucracy by merging 300 state agencies into just 22 and the decreased spending resulted in a substantial budget surplus of $116 million (equivalent to about $720 million in 2026) in the Georgia state treasury by the time Carter left the Governor’s mansion. Although he also achieved success in protecting the environment and getting increased funding for the state’s underfunded school system and his ability to cooperate with Democratic politicians in the state legislature is often regarded as demanding, and gained him a reputation as an arrogant self righteous governor with a "holier than thou" attitude which made him unpopular among members of both houses of the legislature.

President Richard Nixon had narrowly won the 1968 presidential election during a period of deep political division and chaos caused by opposition to the Vietnam War and four years later in 1972 was re-elected in one of the biggest landslide victories in American history. But in 1974, he resigned in the wake of the Watergate scandal in which he was deeply implicated and under the threat of facing impeachment. Vice president Gerald Ford ascended to the presidency, becoming the first president to take office without having been elected as either president or vice president, having been appointed after Nixon's first vice president, Spiro Agnew, resigned in the wake of a tax scandal. Ford nominated Nelson Rockefeller as his vice president.

== Gaining the nomination ==
=== Preparing for a run ===
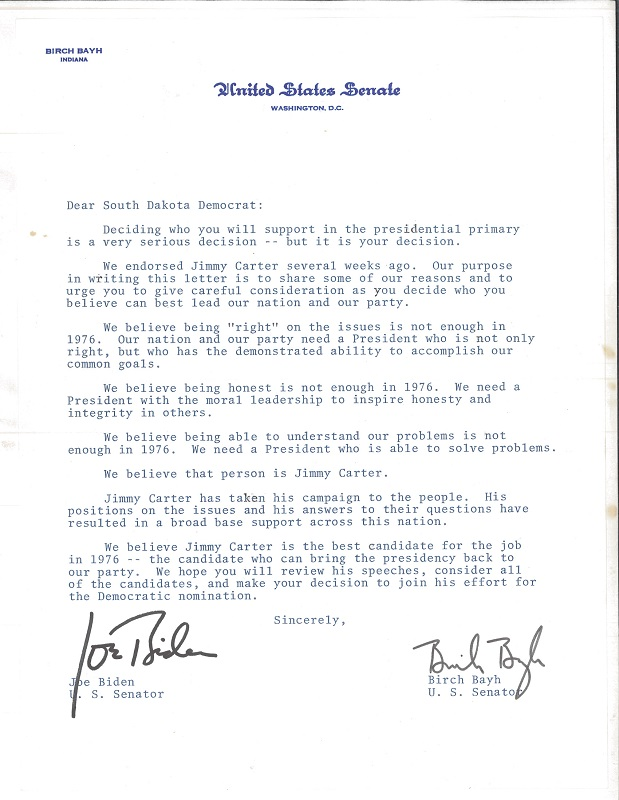
Undated letter from Senators Joe Biden and Birch Bayh, showing their support for Carter.

As the Georgia state constitution barred him from running for a second term as governor, Carter announced his candidacy for president on December 12, 1974. He was the second Democrat to formally announce his candidacy, after Mo Udall. During his campaign announcement speech, he emphasized promises of decency, equality, freedom, and his religious values. He said:

Our Nation now has no understandable national purpose, no clearly defined goals, and no organizational mechanism to develop or achieve such purposes or goals. We move from one crisis to the next as if they were fads, even though the previous one hasn't been solved. The Bible says: "If the trumpet give an uncertain sound, who shall prepare himself to the battle." As a planner and a businessman, and a chief executive, I know from experience that uncertainty is also a devastating affliction in private life and in government. Coordination of different programs is impossible. There is no clear vision of what is to be accomplished, everyone struggles for temporary advantage, and there is no way to monitor how effectively services are delivered.

Initially, many political experts gave Carter little chance of winning the Democratic nomination, because he was little-known outside Georgia, His opponents mocked his candidacy by saying, "Jimmy, who?". In response, Carter started to say, "My name is Jimmy Carter, and I'm running for president". Early polling data showed that a majority of the voters were undecided, but showed a preference for candidates such as Hubert Humphrey and Ted Kennedy. Besides positioning him as anti‐establishment and ideologically centrist, the Carter campaign made early primaries and caucuses a pivotal point in their campaign. Their strategy called for a strong effort in crucial early states.

=== Democratic presidential primaries ===
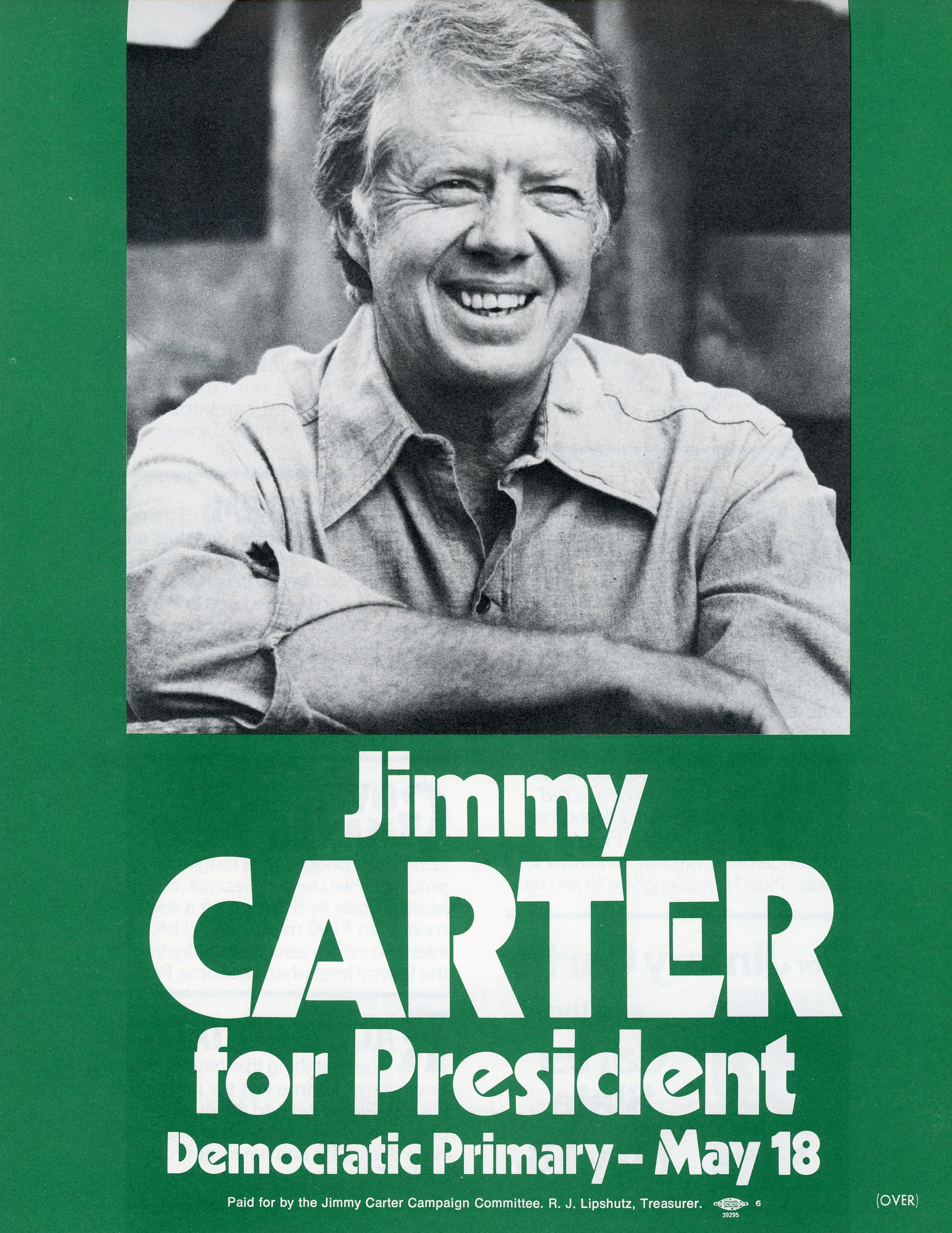
Campaign flyer from Democratic Party presidential primary

In the aftermath of the Watergate scandal, the declining popularity of President Ford due to his pardon of Nixon, and the severe recession of 1974–75, many Democrats were sure of victory in the presidential election. As a result, 17 Democrats were running for the nomination. Primaries were held in all 50 states, from January 19 to June 8, 1976. Apart from Carter, early candidates included Mo Udall, George Wallace, Jerry Brown, Frank Church, Henry M. Jackson, and Sargent Shriver.

There was speculation about the potential candidacy of former vice president and presidential nominee Hubert Humphrey and Senator Ted Kennedy. Kennedy declined to run due to his promise to his mother not to run for president. Humphrey, too, declined to run in the primaries, but he hinted at a campaign and expressed his willingness to accept the nomination. Although Carter led in the Iowa caucus, 37.18% of those voters were uncommitted. George Wallace won the Mississippi caucus after his entry in the primaries. After that, Carter won most of the caucuses and primaries, with an exception being Jerry Brown winning 204 delegates from his home state of California. Although Henry M. Jackson won the Massachusetts and New York primaries, he dropped out after losing the critical Pennsylvania primary to Carter. Udall carried his home state of Arizona and Washington D.C. The early count in the Wisconsin primary showed Udall leading, but eventually Carter won that state.

Carter's primary campaign raised $13.8 million, with $3.5 million coming from federal matching funds. Southern rock groups like The Allman Brothers Band, with whom Carter had a personal relationship, hosted campaign fundraisers during the primaries. One of the band's shows in Providence, Rhode Island resulted in over $64,000 being raised in 1975. A Florida campaign fundraising event that featured Betts, Daniels, The Marshall Tucker Band, Bonnie Bramlett, and the Outlaws raised an additional $280,000 for the Carter campaign. Jimmy Buffett also aided the Carter campaign in Oregon. Not only did these fundraisers help Carter raise money but they also boosted his name recognition around the country, especially since he was not very well known outside of Georgia.

By the end of primaries, Carter had received 39.19% of the popular vote, Brown 15.39%, Wallace 12.29%, Udall 10.13%, Jackson 7.13%, Church 5.22%, and the rest under 5%.

=== Democratic National Convention ===
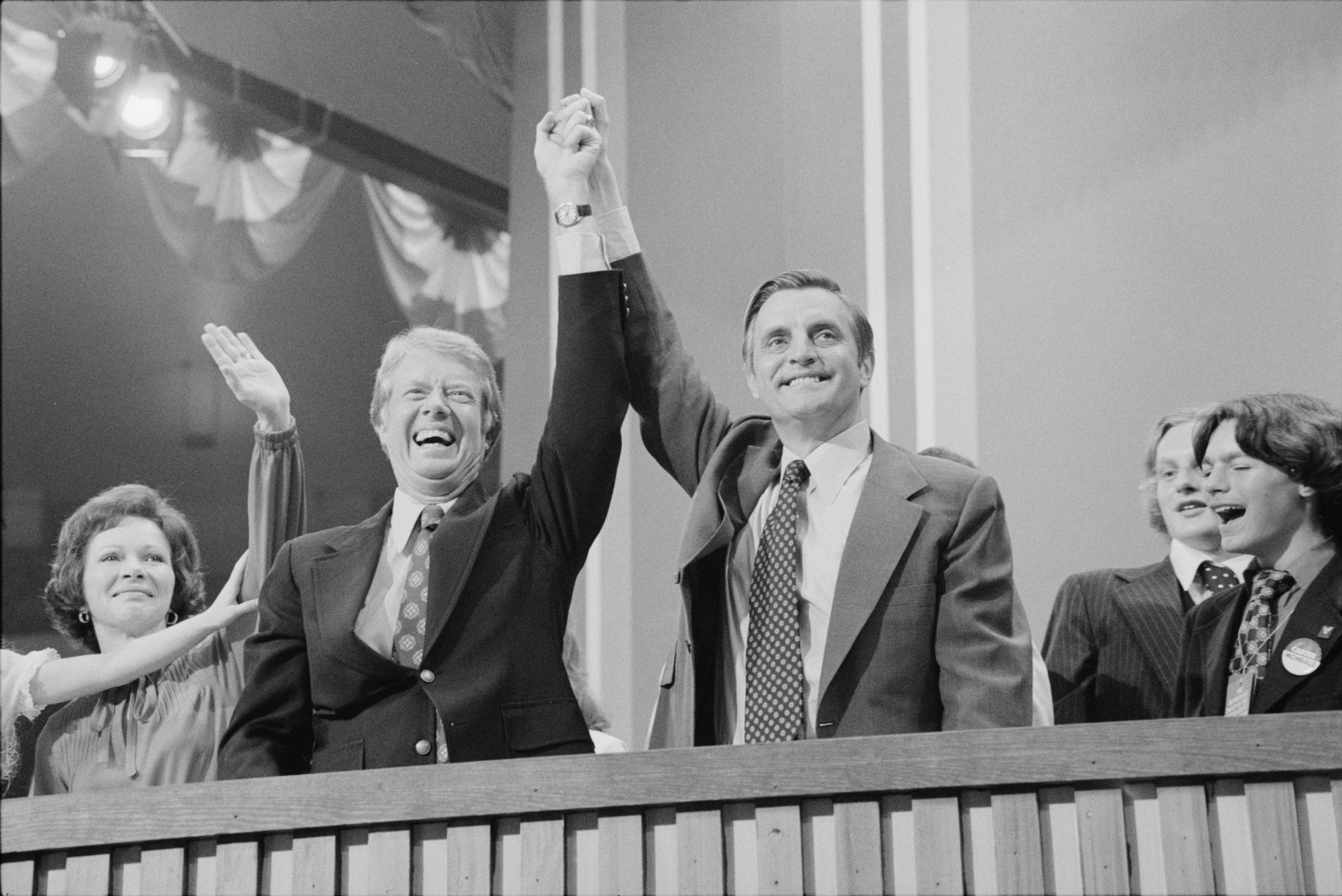
Jimmy Carter and Walter Mondale at the Democratic National Convention, New York City

The 1976 Democratic National Convention was convened at Madison Square Garden in New York City. Notably, Barbara Jordan became the first African-American woman to deliver the keynote address at a Democratic National Convention. With most contests in the states settled in Carter's favor, the convention delegates overwhelmingly favored Carter, although many other candidates also won delegates. Carter received 2,239 delegates, Udall 330, Brown 301, Wallace 57, McCormack 22, Church 19, Humphrey and Jackson each received 10, and other candidates received the remaining 22 delegates. In his acceptance speech, Carter referred to the Vietnam war and the Watergate scandal and said:

Each time our nation has made a serious mistake the American people have been excluded from the process. The tragedy of Vietnam and Cambodia, the disgrace of Watergate, and the embarrassment of the CIA revelations could have been avoided if our government had simply reflected the sound judgement and good common sense and the high moral character of the American people. It is time for us to take a new look at our own government, to strip away the secrecy, to expose the unwarranted pressure of lobbyists, to eliminate waste, to release our civil servants from bureaucratic chaos, to provide tough management, and always to remember that in any town or city the mayor, the governor, and the. President represent exactly the same constituents.

Carter, after getting a sufficient number of delegates to be the nominee, shortlisted six possible vice presidential candidates, which included senators Walter Mondale, Edmund Muskie, John Glenn, Frank Church, Adlai Stevenson III, and Henry "Scoop" Jackson. He ultimately selected Mondale to be his running mate, emphasizing Mondale's experience in Washington D.C., as Carter himself was a Southern "outsider". Carter said that his ticket could bring "the national vigor, vision, aggressive leadership, and a president who feels your pain, shares your dream and takes his strength, wisdom, and courage from citizens". The convention energized the Democratic base and gave the Carter-Mondale ticket a bounce in the polls, from 53% to 62% preference among registered voters.

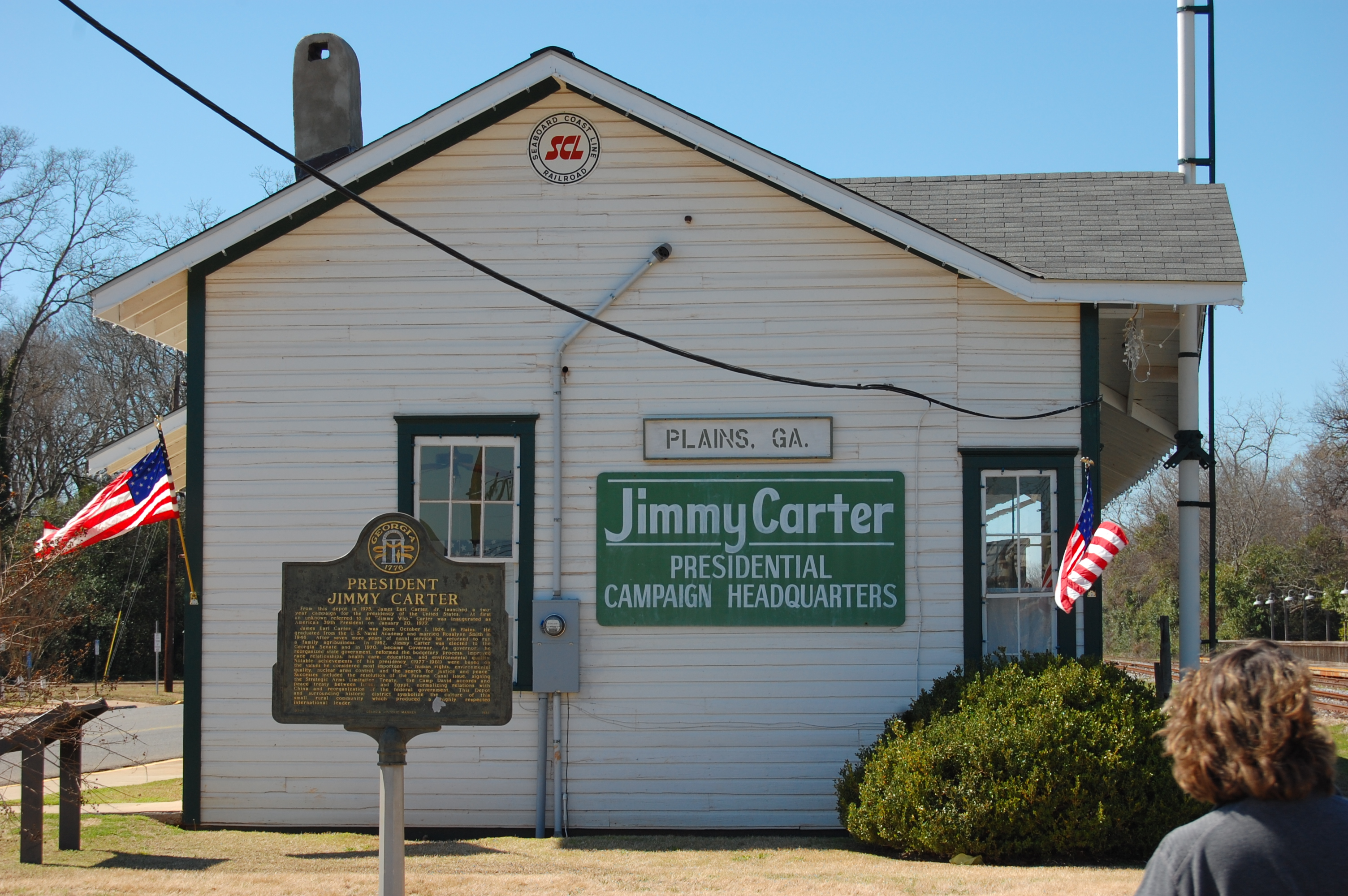
Carter's campaign headquarters in Plains, Georgia

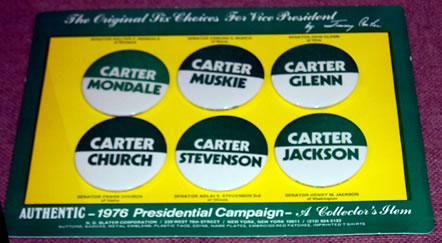
Six possible choices for President Carter's running mate. Walter Mondale was finally selected.

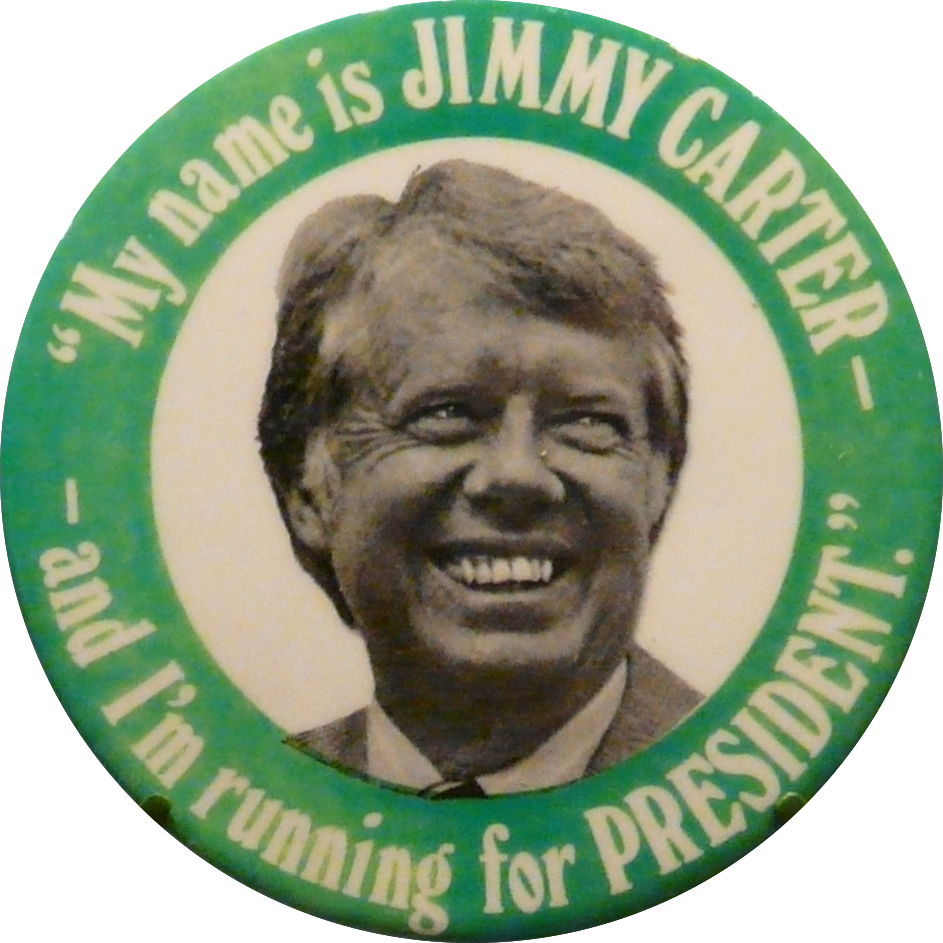
Jimmy Carter's campaign button announcing his campaign with the slogan, "My name is Jimmy Carter and I'm running for President."

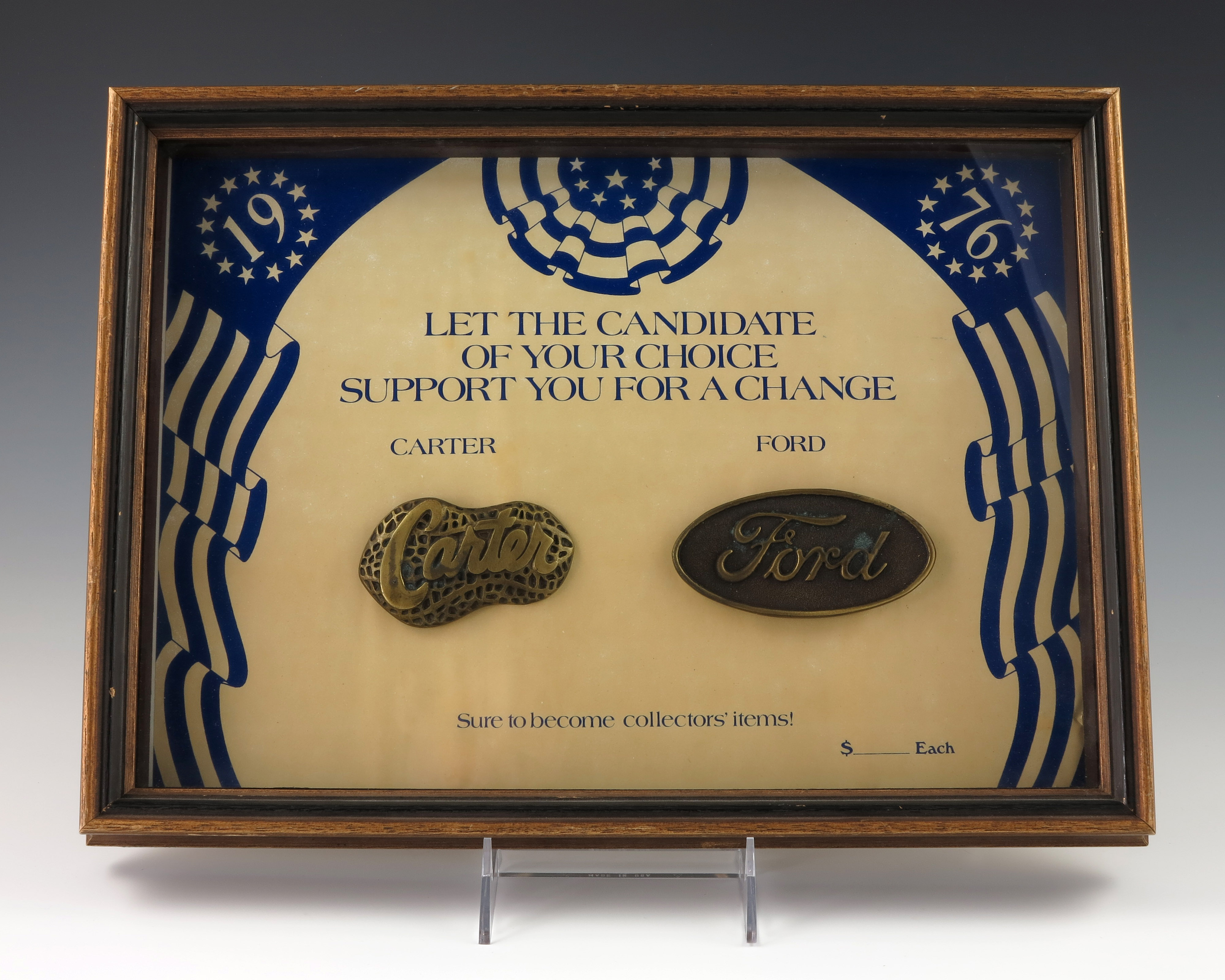
A shadow box containing one peanut-shaped Carter belt buckle and one Ford-logo belt buckle. It reads, "Let the candidate of your choice support you for a change."

== General election campaign ==
=== Getting an opponent ===
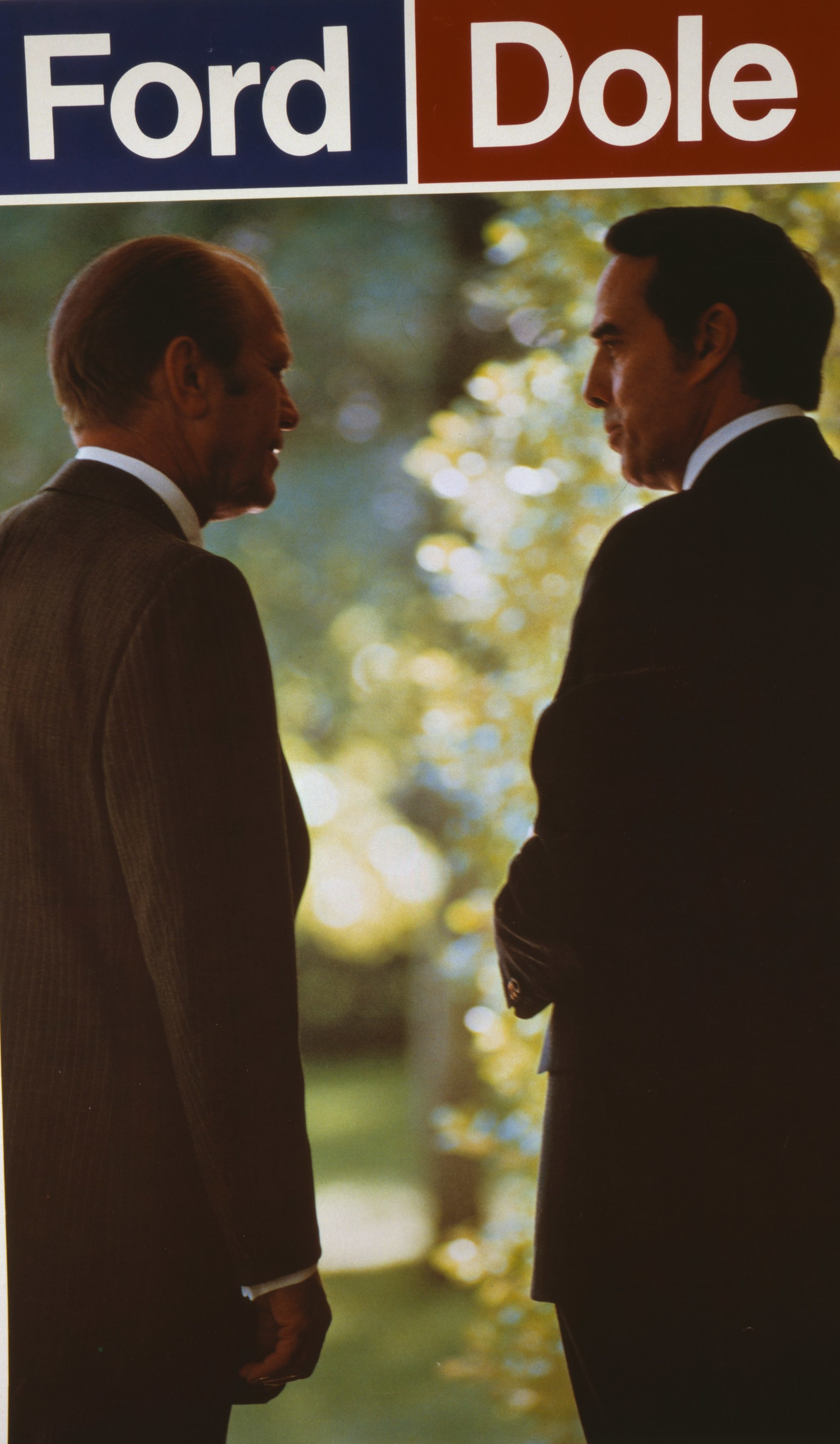
President Ford and Senator Dole

With President Ford's declining approval rating, former Governor of California Ronald Reagan announced his candidacy for president. President Ford reacted to it by saying that his philosophy in politics was to run on his record. Reagan had been viewed as a leading candidate for some time and led a Gallup poll in October 1973 with 29% of the vote. Still, Ford defeated Reagan in the Iowa Caucus, with 45.28% of the vote to Reagan's 42.54%. Ford went on to win early primaries and caucuses, including the Illinois primary with almost 60% of votes. After that, Reagan won crucial states such as North Carolina, Texas, and Georgia. After the Indiana primaries, both candidates were neck-in-neck in winning the remaining primaries. Ford won New Jersey and his home state of Michigan, while Reagan won his home state of California with double Ford's vote.

A year before the election, incumbent vice president Nelson Rockefeller had announced that he wasn't interested in running for election with President Ford, but promised to support him. Ford had won more primary delegates than Reagan, but he didn't yet have the 1,130 delegates needed to be the Republican nominee. His campaign relied on votes from unpledged delegates to gain the nomination, which Ford narrowly won on the first ballot, with 1,187 delegates to Reagan's 1,070. Until the convention, Ford had told no one about his running-mate choice. Reagan told a caucus of the Kansas delegation that he would not accept the vice-presidential nomination. Ultimately, Ford selected Senator Bob Dole of Kansas as his running mate. When delegates voted on the vice presidential nominee, Dole prevailed by an overwhelming 85% of the votes.

In an address to the convention, Reagan conceded to Ford and endorsed the Republican platform in a speech so eloquent that it arguably overshadowed Ford's acceptance address. Reagan said that "We [Republicans] must go forth from here united, determined, that what a great general said a few years ago is true: There is no substitute for victory." Reagan later refused pleas from Ford to campaign on Ford's behalf in battleground states.

=== Campaign ===
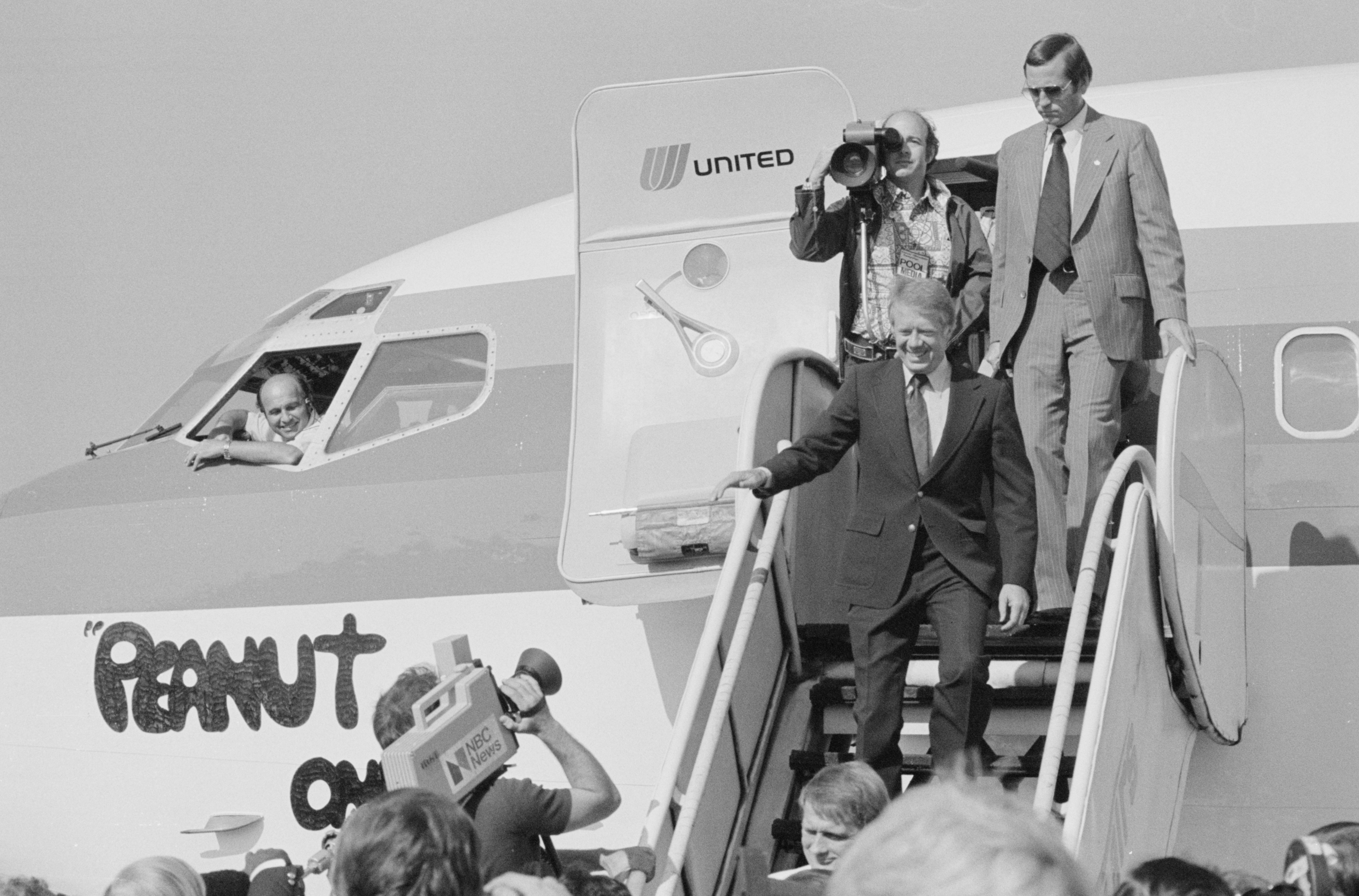
Carter disembarking from the "Peanut One" at Allegheny County Airport in September 1976

The Carter campaign used various television advertisements to promise to restore integrity and trust in government after Watergate. Patrick Meirick, director of the Political Communications Center at the University of Oklahoma in 2015 said "Carter was really talking about fixing politics, and having trust in government again. Some of the ads were almost like cinema verité." In some of his commercials, Carter campaigned for reforming the welfare system and to stop giving benefits to those who refuse jobs when they're offered to them. He made many campaign promises, such as removing any of his cabinet members who mislead the people. He also promised to keep maximum privacy in people's lives and minimum secrecy in government. National Education Association chief John Ryor said that about 7,000 representatives from his 1.8 million-member organization voted more than 4-to-1 to endorse the Carter-Mondale ticket over Ford-Dole.

Carter made campaign stops with a chartered United Airlines Boeing 727, nicknamed "Peanut One." Coincidentally, his pilot was also named Jimmy Carter.

Walter Mondale campaigned for the ticket in various states. While campaigning in Toledo, Ohio he said that the country needs a strong president to stop inflation, and the current president didn't have the guts to stand up to big business. During a rally, Rosalynn Carter criticized President Ford for building a wall around himself by not answering questions in public. Meanwhile, Ford was also being investigated for allegations of campaign finance improprieties in his former congressional district elections. On October 1, it was concluded by a special Watergate prosecutor that there would be no criminal charges against him.

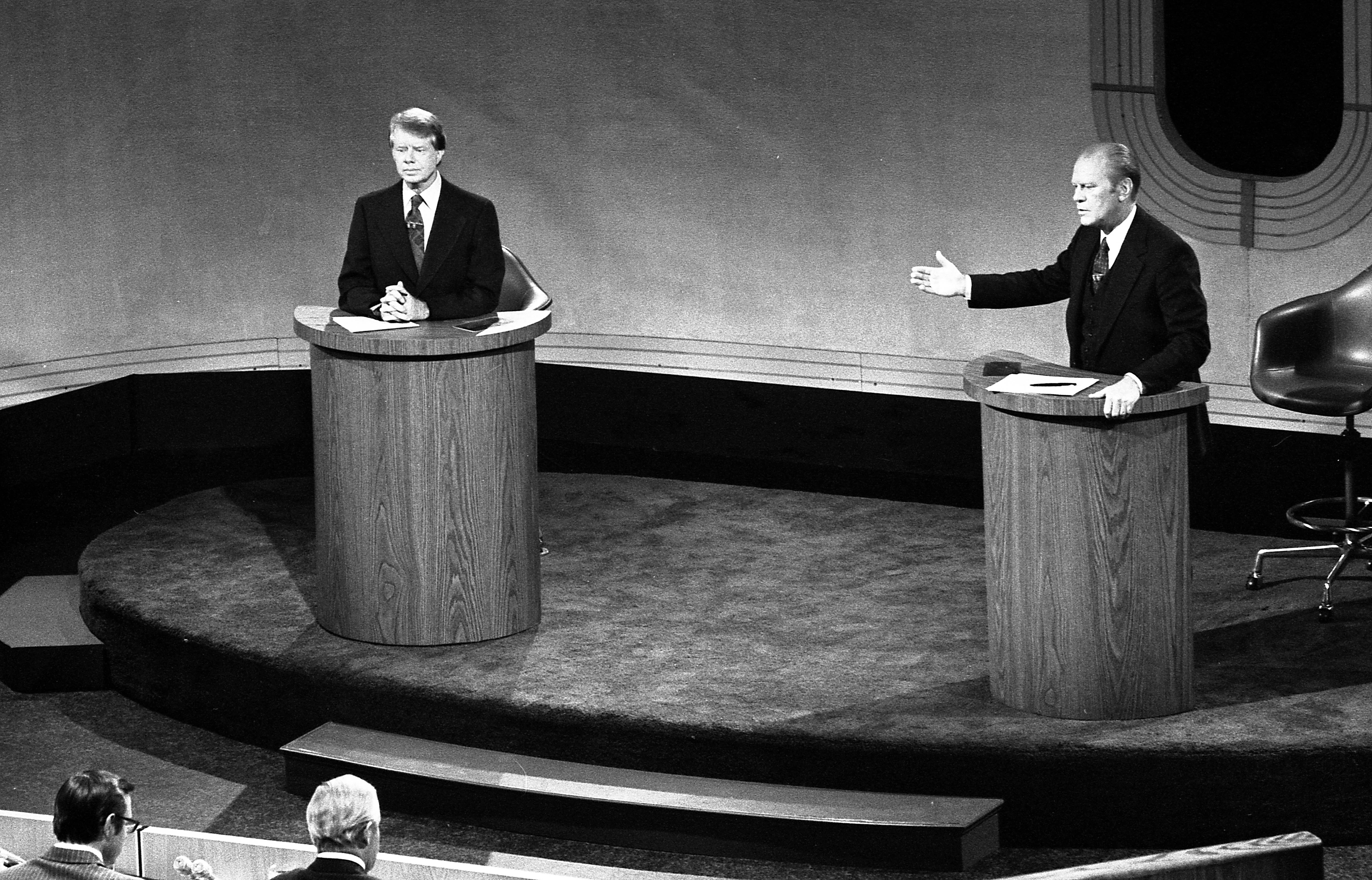
Jimmy Carter and Gerald Ford at the first presidential debate on September 23, 1976

=== Debates ===
The League of Women Voters decided to conduct debates for presidential and vice-presidential candidates. These were the first debates after the 1960 presidential debates. Facing a possible blackout by three commercial television networks for their rule that would censor the audience's reaction, the league talked with representatives of both the campaigns and modified the rule. Three presidential debates and one vice-presidential debate were broadcast. The first debate was viewed by 69.7 million people, where President Ford appeared to outpoint Carter. In his closing statement, Carter said:

Our nation in the last eight years has been divided as never before. It's a time for unity. It's a time to draw ourselves together to have a president and a Congress that can work together with mutual respect for a change, cooperating for a change, in the open for a change, so the people can understand their own government. It's time for government, industry, labor, manufacturing, agriculture, education, other entities in our society to cooperate. And it's a time for government to understand and to cooperate with our people. For a long time our American citizens have been excluded, sometimes misled, sometimes have been lied to.

In the second presidential debate, while answering a question on the US relationship with the Russians and their influence in Europe, Ford said, "There is no Soviet domination of Eastern Europe and there never will be under a Ford administration." Ford's pernicious misremembering was a gaffe that likely damaged his campaign. During the vice-presidential debate between Dole and Mondale, Dole said, "I figured it up the other day: If we added up the killed and wounded in Democrat wars in this century, it would be about 1.6 million Americans – enough to fill the city of Detroit." Senator Dole came under widespread criticism for using the phrase "Democrat wars" in a nationally televised debate. Carter was interviewed by Robert Scheer of Playboy for the November 1976 issue, which hit the newsstands a couple of weeks before the election. With election day approaching, the preference polls had both the candidates almost tied, with Ford having a slight lead of 49% to 48%.

== Election day ==
Electoral college results for 1976 U.S. presidential election.

On election day, Carter carried 23 states with 297 electoral votes, while Ford won 27 states with 240 electoral votes (one faithless elector pledged to Ford, from Washington state, voted for Reagan). The electoral vote was the closest since 1916. Carter's victory came primarily from his near-sweep of the South, as he lost only Virginia and Oklahoma there, and his narrow victories in large Northern states, such as New York, Ohio, and Pennsylvania. Ford did well in the West, carrying every state in that region except for Hawaii. The most tightly contested state in the election was Oregon; Ford won that state by under 2,000 votes.

Carter's winning 23 states was only the first time since Kennedy's victory, and the second time in history, that the winner of the election won fewer than half the states. President Ford conceded the race to Carter the same night. First lady Betty Ford spoke on his behalf as he had lost his voice that same day. She said:

The President asked me to tell you that he telephoned President-elect Carter a short time ago and congratulated him on his victory. The President also wants to thank all those thousands of people who worked so hard on his behalf and the millions who supported him with their votes. It has been the greatest honor of my husband's life to have served his fellow Americans during 2 of the most difficult years in our history.

=== Results ===
Electoral results
Presidential candidate	Party	Home state	Popular vote		Electoral vote	Running mate		
Presidential candidate	Party	Home state	Count	Percentage	Electoral vote	Vice-presidential candidate	Home state	Electoral vote
James Earl Carter Jr.	Democratic	Georgia	40,831,881	50.08%	297	Walter Frederick Mondale	Minnesota	297
Gerald Rudolph Ford Jr. (Incumbent)	Republican	Michigan	39,148,634	48.02%	240	Robert Joseph Dole	Kansas	241
Ronald Wilson Reagan	Republican	California	— (Note: Mike Padden, a Republican faithless elector from Washington, gave Ronald Reagan one electoral vote.)	—	1	Robert Joseph Dole	Kansas	241
Eugene McCarthy	None	Minnesota	740,460	0.91%	0	(Note: McCarthy's running mate varied from state to state.)		0
Roger MacBride	Libertarian	Virginia	172,557	0.21%	0	David Bergland	California	0
Lester Maddox	American Independent	Georgia	170,274	0.21%	0	William Dyke	Wisconsin	0
Thomas J. Anderson	American	(Note: Research has not yet determined whether Anderson's home state was Tennessee or Texas at the time of the 1976 election.)	158,271	0.19%	0	Rufus Shackelford	Florida	0
Peter Camejo	Socialist Workers	California	90,986	0.11%	0	Willie Mae Reid	Illinois	0
Gus Hall	Communist	New York	58,709	0.07%	0	Jarvis Tyner	New York	0
Margaret Wright	People's	California	49,013	0.06%	0	Benjamin Spock	Connecticut	0
Lyndon LaRouche	U.S. Labor	New York	40,043	0.05%	0	R. Wayne Evans	Michigan	0
Other			70,785	0.08%	—	Other		—
Total			81,531,584	100%	538			538
Needed to win					270			270

Source - 1976 Presidential General Election Results

== Aftermath and legacy ==
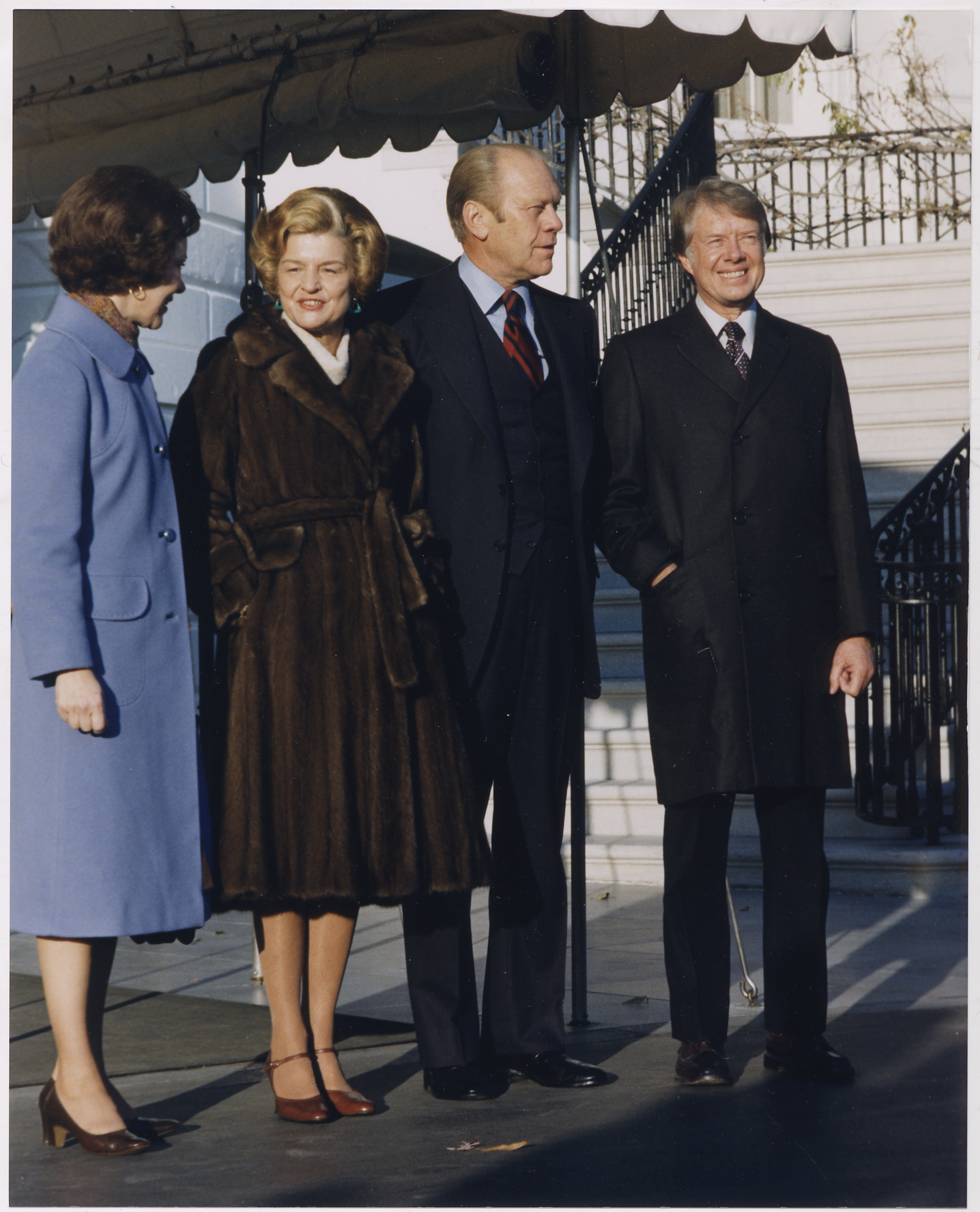
President-elect Carter and Rosalynn Carter meets with outgoing President Gerald Ford and First lady Betty Ford.

The presidential transition of Jimmy Carter was the first systematic exercise in transition planning. He started his effort in the spring of 1976 when he became the presumptive Democratic nominee. Jack Watson was Carter's transition director. The pre-election transition effort was funded using $150,000 in campaign money, which created tension between Watson and Carter's campaign manager, Hamilton Jordan. After the election, President Ford assured his co-operation in the transfer of power. Jimmy Carter was inaugurated as the 39th president of the United States on January 20, 1977. He lost his re-election campaign in 1980 in a landslide to the Republican nominee, Ronald Reagan. Reagan defeated Walter Mondale in the 1984 presidential election.

Carter was the only Democratic president between 1969 (Lyndon B. Johnson) and 1993 (Bill Clinton). Carter spent the years following his presidency being involved in a variety of national and international public policy, conflict resolution, human rights, and charitable causes, through the Carter Foundation. He was awarded the Nobel Peace Prize in 2002 for his post-presidential work in finding peaceful solutions to international conflicts.

Notably, this is the only modern presidential election in which both presidential and both vice-presidential candidates were still alive 30 years after the election, until Ford's death in 2006, and three of the four were alive after 44 years, until Walter Mondale's death in April 2021. Following Bob Dole's death in December 2021, Carter was the only candidate still living until his death in December 2024.

== See also ==
- 1976 Democratic Party presidential primaries
- 1976 Democratic Party vice presidential candidate selection
- 1976 Democratic National Convention
- 1976 United States presidential election
- Presidential transition of Jimmy Carter
- Inauguration of Jimmy Carter
- Gerald Ford 1976 presidential campaign
- Jimmy Carter 1980 presidential campaign
