= Presidential transition of Jimmy Carter =

Transfer of presidential power from Gerald Ford to Jimmy Carter

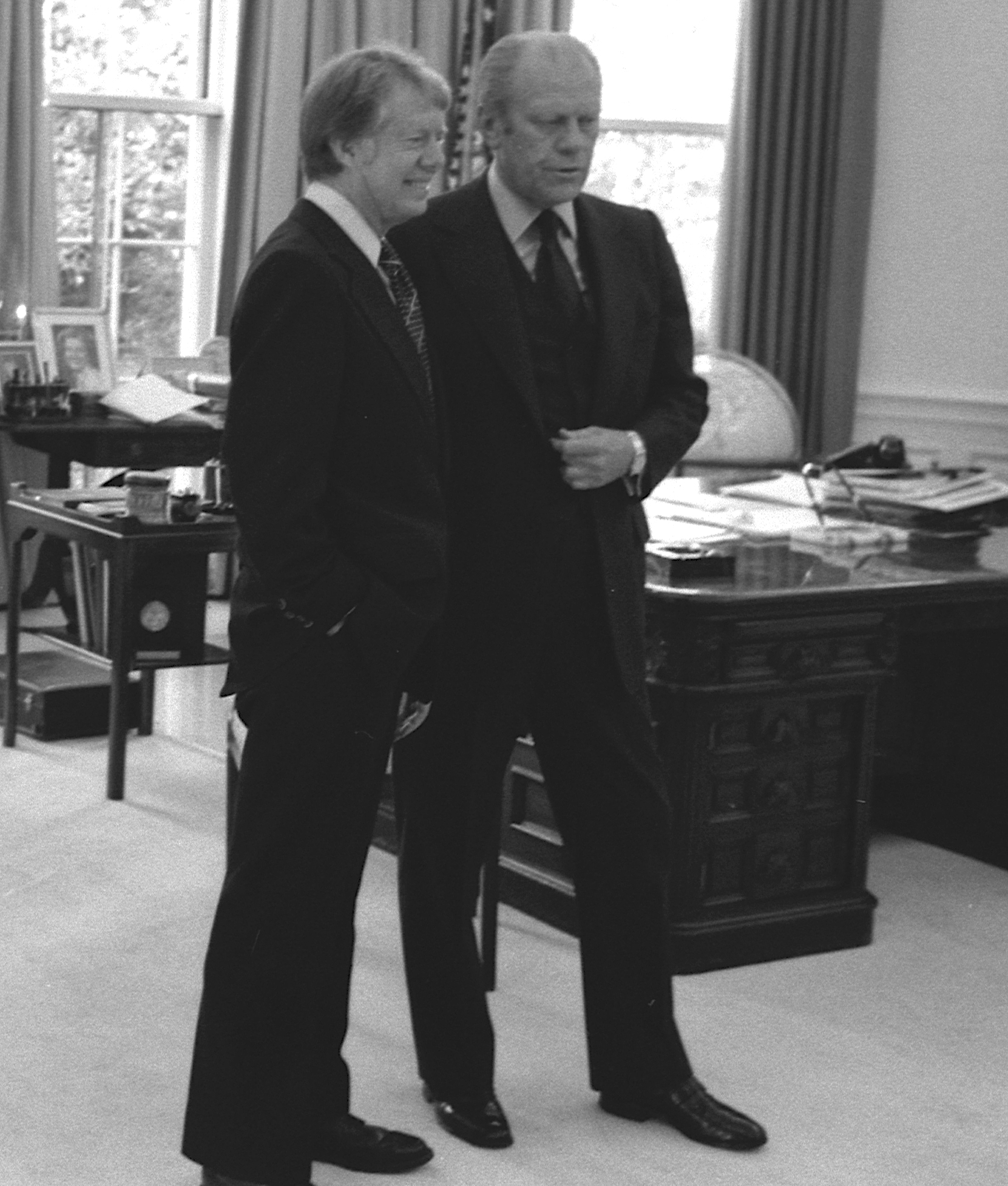
- President Gerald Ford (right) meeting with President-elect Jimmy Carter (left) in the Oval Office of the White House on November 22, 1976.
- Election date: November 2, 1976
- Transition start: November 3, 1976
- Inauguration date: January 20, 1977
- President-elect: Jimmy Carter (Democrat)
- Vice president-elect: Walter Mondale (Democrat)
- Outgoing president: Gerald Ford (Republican)
- Outgoing vice president: Nelson Rockefeller (Republican)
- Headquarters: Plains, Georgia
- Director: Jack Watson

The presidential transition of Jimmy Carter began when he won the 1976 United States presidential election, becoming the president-elect, and ended when Carter was inaugurated on January 20, 1977. Carter had become president-elect once the election results became clear on November 3, 1976, the day after the election.

Carter's presidential transition was headed by Jack Watson, and was headquartered in Plains, Georgia. The transition experienced delays in naming appointees.

Carter's transition effort was significantly larger and more complex than previous presidential transitions, and cost more than previous transitions. Analysts have argued that Carter's transition marked an evolution in United States presidential transitions, approaching as a systematic exercise to what had previously been a smaller-scale and more informal process. They have also argued that he set a precedent for undertaking serious pre-election efforts to plan out his transition, as Carter began preparing for a potential presidential transition in the months before the election (having a substantial planning effort in place by June). Carter was the first United States presidential candidate to provide substantial pre-election staff and funding to transition preparations.

== Pre-election developments ==
=== Legislative change ===
In 1976, legislation was passed which increased federal funding for presidential transitions to $2 million for the incoming president's transition effort and $1 million to the administration of the outgoing president, an increase from the total of $450,000 that had been originally allotted under the Presidential Transition Act of 1963.

=== Early planning ===
Carter had a significant pre-election effort planning for a prospective presidential transition. While some presidential candidates had previously conducted some pre-election transition plannings, Carter was the first presidential candidate to allot significant funds and a significant number of personnel to such an effort.

The origins of this effort came in April 1976, after Carter's victory over Henry M. Jackson in the Pennsylvania primary, by many accounts, made Carter the Democratic Party's likely nominee. Jack Watson had gotten the idea for such an effort around this time, after separate discussions with Jule Sugarman and Charles Kirbo, the latter of whom was serving as the Carter campaign's finance chairman for the state of Georgia. After discussions about this, Watson prepared a memorandum for Carter, with Sugarman and Kirbo's input, outlining the need for presidential transition planning. Carter received Watson's memorandum in June, and was accepting of the idea. On June 10, Carter informed Watson that he would like him to head the transition planning effort. It was later recalled that Watson had been surprised by this, expecting that Carter would have instead selected a Washington, D.C. political insider for the job. Watson accepted Carter's request. Carter also made the demand that the transition planning should be operated separately from the campaign, so that campaign staff would not be distracted from focusing on their campaign work.

By July, following the Democratic National Convention, a formal transition planning team was put in place. Watson hired a group of youthful Washington, D.C., insiders to assist him with policy planning. Nearly the entire team was in their 30s. The pre-election transition staff numbered roughly 50 people. Anthony Lake headed the foreign policy team. Harrison Wellford, who was Senator Philip Hart's chief legislative assistant, headed efforts related government reorganization and White House staffing. Among the member of the economic team was Bowman Cutter. While Carter's campaign was heavily staffed by Washington, D.C. outsiders from Georgia, the team for his pre-election transition planning effort was started largely by individuals with Washington, D.C. experience who, were primary not from Georgia. The group was based in Atlanta, Georgia. In addition to policy planning, they also conducted a limited preliminary search for potential appointees to a potential Carter administration.

In July, Carter had attempted to get the Federal Election Commission (FEC) to exempt transition planning expenses from being their definition of "qualified campaign expenses", which would have allowed private contributions, instead of utilizing federal campaign matching funds. However, the FEC voted in a partisan split on this, with Republican members opposing it, thus preventing this change from happening. After this decision by the FEC, Carter diverted $150,000 in campaign money to his pre-election transition effort, which created tension between Watson and Carter's campaign manager, Hamilton Jordan. His failed effort to get the FEC to make that change also made the existence of his pre-election transition planning team public knowledge.

Carter, at the outset, had ordered Watson to operate under-the radar, so that Carter would not appear overconfident of his victory to the public. Despite this, Watson also spoke to the media, conducting several interviews with the press. Hires made to the transition team were reported in the media, rather than remaining secretive.

With Jordan and other leaders of Carter's campaign operation being wary about Watson's transition planning effort, Jordan appointed Jim Grammill to act as a liaison between the campaign and the transition planning effort. However, the transition effort attempted to keep Grammill in the dark about their work, not wanting campaign leadership in the loop about their efforts.

In August, Watson and Bowman Cutter spent a day in Washington, D.C. receiving briefings from members of the Senate Budget Committee. In September and October, Watson held meetings with a number of academic experts, members of past presidential administrations, and Washington, D.C., insiders. These included members of the John F. Kennedy and Lyndon B. Johnson administrations, such Joseph A. Califano Jr., Clark Clifford, Stephen H. Hess, Bill Moyers, Richard Neustadt, and Ted Sorensen. To discuss budget-related matters, Watson and Cutter held meetings with Arnold Packer and Nancy Teeters. Watson and Cutter also talked to the Brookings Institution about budget-related matters. Among other individuals that Watson had also met with before the election was former Nixon personnel director Fred Malek, who was willing to provide advice despite being a supporter of Gerald Ford's reelection effort.

== Official transition ==
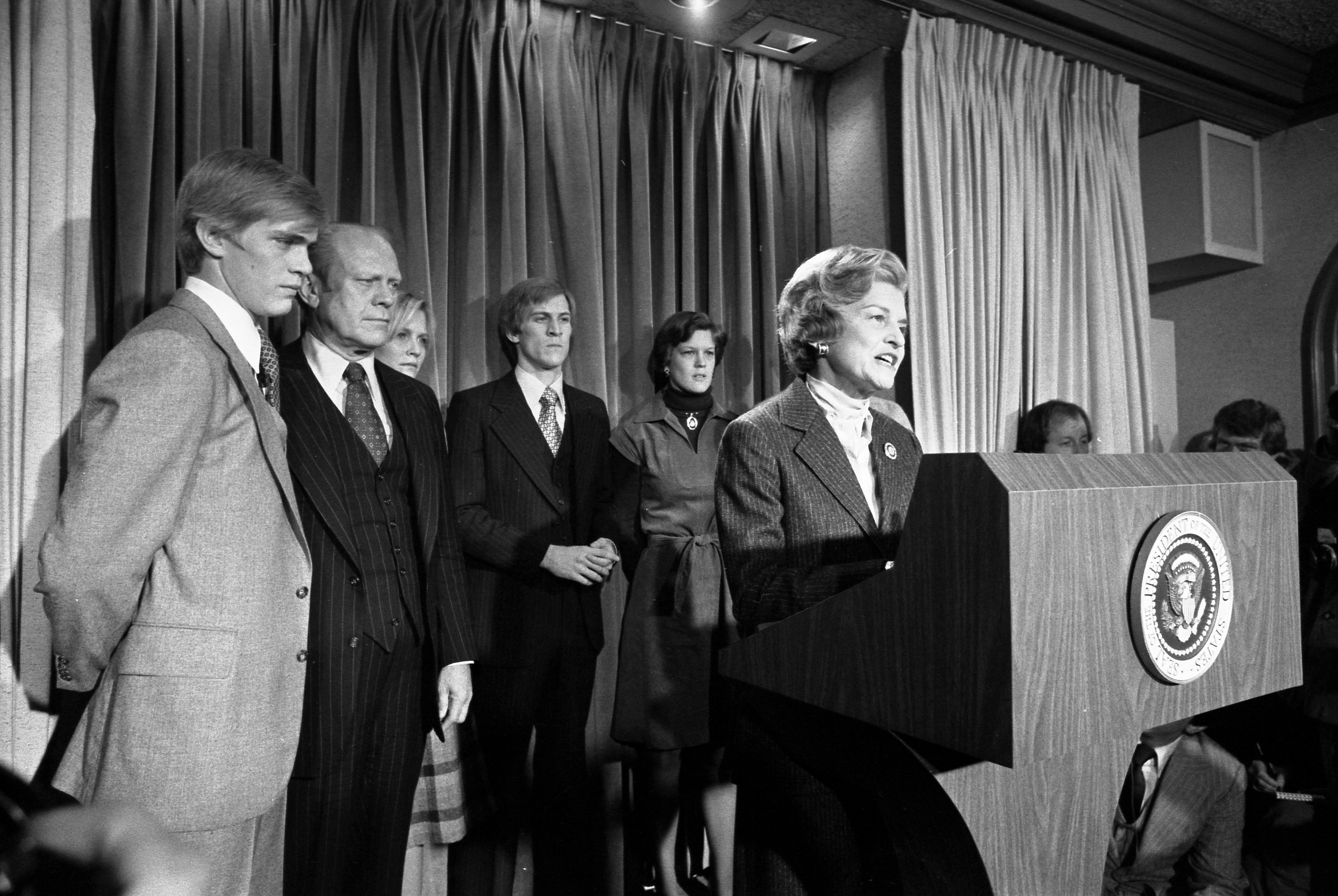
President Ford, unable to speak due to a hoarse voice, watches as his wife Betty delivers concession remarks on his behalf

In the early hours of November 3, 1976 (the day after the election), the major United States news networks projected Carter to have won the election and become the president-elect of the United States. President Gerald Ford sent Carter a concession telegram. Due to having developed a hoarse voice, Ford had his wife, First Lady Betty Ford, deliver remarks to the media on his behalf at 12:14 AM Eastern Standard Time, publicly conceding the election and congratulating the president-elect.

Carter headquartered his transition effort in Plains, Georgia. Some operations were located in Atlanta, and others aspects were located in federally-provided offices in Washington, D.C. The transition continued to be led by Jack Watson. On November 3, Carter sent a letter to outgoing president Gerald Ford informing him that Watson would be his principal representative for coordinating transition arrangements. There was a post-election power struggle between Watson and Carter's campaign manager Hamilton Jordan, in which Carter ultimately sided with Watson. Watson and Jordan's respective roles in the transition were made clearer on November 10. After a meeting between the two of them and Carter that day, Jody Powell announced to reporters that neither would be given official titles for their roles, but that Jordan would oversee White House staffing, and Watson would oversee all other matters of the transition. On November 15, during Carter's second post-election press conference, Carter announced that Jordan would oversee personnel decisions. The power struggle generated headlines in the press, creating an unflattering impression of the president-elect.

The role of the outgoing Ford administration in the transition was headed by White House Chief of Staff Dick Cheney.

Among Carter's top advisors to his transition was Stuart E. Eizenstat. Staffers of Vice President-elect Walter Mondale also had input on the transition.

Carter's transition effort was significantly larger and more complex than previous presidential transitions had been, and cost more than previous transitions. For instance, Carter had a staff six times larger than the transition staff of the presidential transition of John F. Kennedy. However, Carter was very cautious that the administration not go over-budget.

During the transition, Carter reached out to some Ford administration officials, such as Stephen H. Hess, for advice. Many of Carter's designees for offices did not pay much attention to the advice that their outgoing counterparts sought to communicate to them.

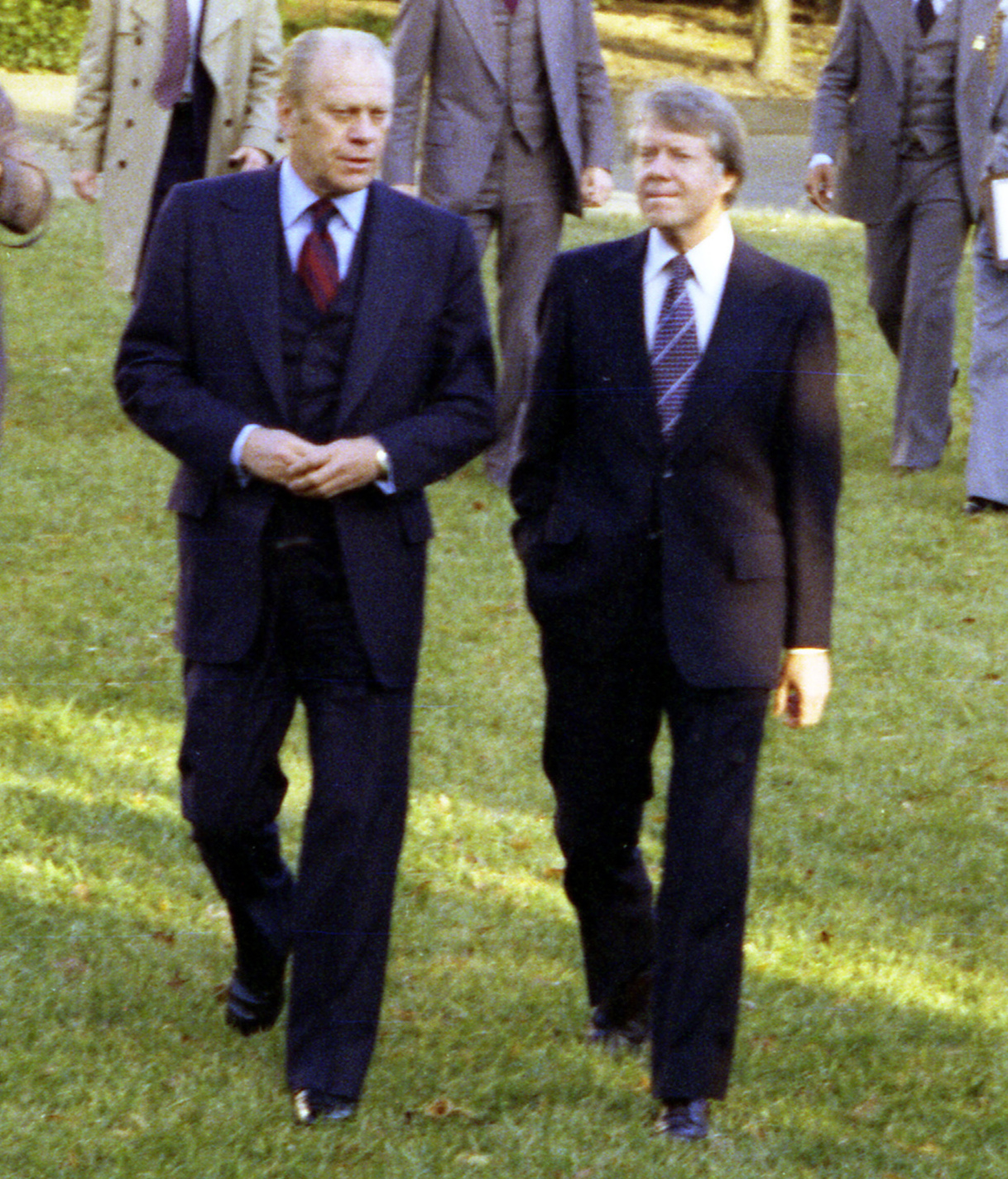
President-elect Carter (right) and President Ford walk through the White House Rose Garden during Carter's November 22 White House visit

On November 22, Carter conducted his first visit to Washington, D.C. since being elected. President Ford hosted President-elect Carter at the White House. That same day, Carter met with director of the Office of Management and Budget James Thomas Lynn and secretary of defense Donald Rumsfeld at the Blair House. The following day, Carter conferred with congressional leaders, expressing that his meetings with Cabinet members had been "very helpful" and saying Ford had requested he seek out his assistance if needing anything. However, there was frigid relationship between the Carter and President Ford during the transition.

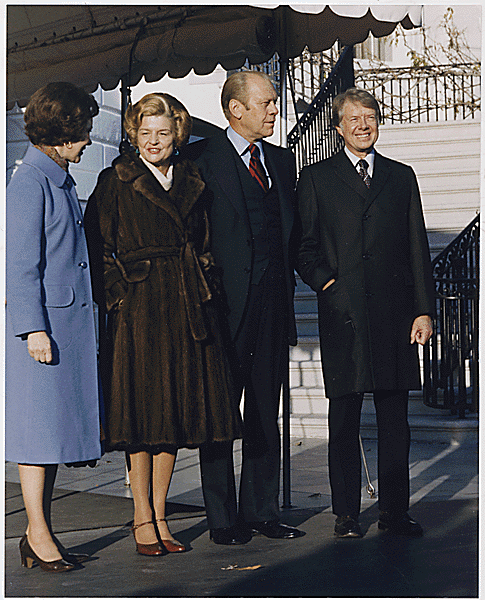
The Fords welcome the Carters to the White House on November 22

During the transition, the outgoing first lady (Betty Ford) postponed scheduled plans to give a tour of the White House to the incoming first lady (Carter's wife, Rosalynn). Unbeknownst to the Carters or their associates at the time, the reason for this was likely concerns over Mrs. Ford's own fragile state. Mrs. Ford privately had an ongoing struggle with substance abuse, which she would later seek treatment for. When Mrs. Ford attempted to postpone the tour a second time, President-Carter called the White House and threatened to publicly complain about the Fords to the news media if the tour was not held as scheduled. The Fords capitulated, and Mrs. Ford gave Mrs. Carter a brief but cordial tour of the White House on November 22, 1976, coinciding with President-elect Carter's White House meeting with President Ford.

On December 9, Carter was presented plans for reform on housing, transportation, and urban development during a meeting with transition advisors at the Blair House.

On December 13, Carter's election was confirmed by the United States Electoral College. United States Congress would later meet on January 6 to ascertain the Electoral College count.

Carter sought to promote his plan to reorganize government in order to make it more efficient. In December and early January, he met with Democratic congressional leaders, who were not overly enthusiastic about the plan. After this response, he tried bringing it to Republicans.

On December 22, Carter and Nelson Rockefeller (the outgoing vice president) each went to Chicago and attended the funeral of Chicago mayor Richard J. Daley. The following day, Carter named the last of his Cabinet designees. Over the Christmas holidays, he held the first meetings of his designated Cabinet at Sea Island, Georgia.

On January 4, Carter told reporters that he would free himself from potential conflicts of interest by leaving his peanut business in the hands of trustees.

On January 6, Carter asked former governor of Maine Kenneth M. Curtis to serve as chair of the Democratic National Committee.

On January 13, Carter set up an economic summit meeting for non-Communist countries in a call with foreign leaders from Japan, France, Germany, and Great Britain. The conference was set for April.

Having campaigned as an outsider against the "swamp" of Washington, D.C., Carter's advisors urged him to maintain an image of the "citizen president" during his transition.

=== Financing of transition ===
Carter's transition cost more than previous transitions. Federal financing was made available to Carter and the outgoing Ford administration, as per the Presidential Transitions Act. Carter received $2 million from the federal government to fund his transition. Being under-budget, he returned $300,000 to the United States Treasury after his inauguration. The outgoing Ford administration was allotted $1 million by the federal government. $905,000 of this went to President Ford's expenses, and $95,000 went to the expenses of Vice President Nelson Rockefeller.

=== Selection of appointees ===
There was initially conflict between the Democratic National Committee, Carter advisor Hamilton Jordan, and Director of the Transition Jack Watson as to who would take a leading role in hiring. Carter sided with Jordan, allowing him to be in charge of personnel. Carter was very involved in personnel decisions, and the transition was relatively slow in filling Carter's Cabinet. Carter used a selection process for choosing his Cabinet which involved elaborate interviewing process, as he was not well-acquainted with Washington, D.C. insiders. In filling Cabinet positions, while he did appoint many Washington, D.C., insiders, Carter ultimately leaned towards appointing a large number loyalists from Georgia. Many of these outsider appointees were young and inexperienced.

Hamilton Jordan succeeded in influencing the ultimate personnel decisions, as Carter would ultimately hire many campaign team members to his administration.

Vice President-elect Walter Mondale had some input, giving some feedback on prospective appointees.

Carter received 125,000 referrals and requests. 16,000 of them came from members of the United States Congress.

In his November 15 press conference, Carter pledged to select appointees using a process designed, "to insure that the best person in the country is chosen for each position". He also pledged to find new talent, including women and minorities, and said that his selection process would be unprecedented in its openness.

There were parallel candidate searches going on. One was run by operatives in D.C. and was known as the "Washington talent inventory program" (TIP), others were conducted directly by Carter's direct political operatives, and others were conducted by interest groups looking to compile lists of recommended candidates for Carter.

The transition experienced delays in announcing key appointments. Five weeks after his election, Carter began announcing key appointments for his administration. Carter announced his first two Cabinet selections at this time. Carter announced a number of national security and economic post selections by seven weeks after his victory. By December 23, Carter had announced all of his Cabinet selections.

Carter, when he was governor of Georgia, where the gubernatorial cabinet consisted partially of independently-elected state constitutional officers, had been used to working with strong and independent cabinet. In shaping his presidential administration, Carter granted his Cabinet designees large liberty to help select sub-cabinet appointees. Richard Nixon had, similarly, given his Cabinet secretaries large liberty in selecting their subordinates, a decision that is credited with having weakened his control over the policy direction of his administration. In the case of Carter's presidency, it would have a similar effect.

Carter filled his entire Cabinet before he even announced any of his White House staff, with the exception of announcing his White House press secretary. Carter also made an effort to follow through on a campaign pledge to decrease the size of the White House staff by 30%. He believed in having a smaller White House staff with less influence over government than Richard Nixon had come to have. Nixon's White House staff had given orders to his Cabinet. Disagreeing with the practice Nixon adopted during his presidency of having a strong White House staff and weak Cabinet, Carter declared at his first post-election press conference, "I would never permit my White House staff to try to run the major departments of government. The White House staff would be serving in a staff capacity only. Not in an administrative capacity." Incidentally, Nixon had originally, during his transition, had similar notions of a "Cabinet government". A week prior to his inauguration, Carter named his White House staff, which consisted largely of individuals from Georgia. Carter did not name a White House chief of staff, as he was opposed to having one, and would, in his early presidency, go without having one.

After proving to be a controversial pick, the choice of Ted Sorensen for director of the Central Intelligence Agency, was withdrawn.

==== Defense and foreign policy ====
- Andrew Young, United States ambassador to the United Nations (announced December 16, 1976)
- Harold Brown, secretary of defense (announced December 21, 1976)
- Cyrus Vance, secretary of state (announced December 3, 1976)
- Zbigniew Brzezinski, national security advisor (announced December 16, 1976)
- Ted Sorensen, director of the Central Intelligence Agency (announced December 23, 1976; withdrawn January 17, 1977)

==== Domestic policy ====
- Griffin Bell, attorney general (announced December 20, 1976)
- Bob Bergland, secretary of agriculture (announced December 20, 1976)
- Joe Califano, secretary of health, education, and welfare (announced December 23, 1976)
- Patricia Roberts Harris, secretary of housing and urban development (announced December 21, 1976)
- Cecil Andrus, secretary of the interior (announced December 18, 1976)
- Ray Marshall, secretary of labor (announced December 21, 1976)
- Brock Adams, secretary of transportation (announced December 14, 1976)
- James R. Schlesinger, special advisor on energy (announced December 23, 1976)

==== Economic policy ====
- Juanita Kreps, secretary of commerce (announced December 20, 1976)
- W. Michael Blumenthal, secretary of the treasury (announced December 14, 1976)
- Bert Lance, director of the Office of Management and Budget (announced December 3, 1976)
- Charles Schultze, chair of the Council of Economic Advisors (announced December 16, 1976)
- Robert T. Hall, assistant secretary of commerce for economic development (announced January 14, 1977)
- Jerry Jasinowski, assistant secretary of commerce for economic policy (announced January 14, 1977)
- Anne Wexler, deputy undersecretary of commerce for regional affairs (announced January 14, 1977)

==== White House staff ====
- Jody Powell, White House press secretary (announced November 15, 1976)
- Robert Lipshutz, White House counsel (announced January 14, 1977)
- Midge Costanza, director of the Office of Public Liaison (announced January 14, 1977)
- Frank Moore, assistant for congressional liaison (announced January 14, 1977)
- Jack Watson, assistant to president for intergovernmental relations and secretary to the Cabinet (announced January 14, 1977)
- Stuart E. Eizenstat, White House domestic affairs advisor (announced January 14, 1977)
- Hamilton Jordan, assistant to the president (announced January 14, 1977)
- Timothy Kraft, White House director of political affairs (announced January 14, 1977)
- Joseph W. Aragon, White House ombudsman (announced January 14, 1977)
- James B. King, special assistant to the president for personnel (announced January 14, 1977)
- Martha Mallard "Bunny" Mitchell, special assistant to the president for special projects (announced January 14, 1977)
- Peter Bourne, special advisor to the president on mental health and drug abuse (announced January 14, 1977)

== Historical assessment of the transition ==
In his book Presidential Transitions: From Politics To Practice, John P. Burke noted the unprecedented scope of Carter's transition project. However, he assesses the transition, "something of a lost opportunity". He places some blame for the transition's shortcomings directly at Carter's feet.

=== Impact on subsequent transitions ===
A 1998 article by Anthony J. Eksterowicz and Glenn Hastedt published in 'Presidential Studies Quarterly argued that, "Carter was the first modern president to think systematically about his transition". Scholar John P. Burke has credited Carter as being the first transition in which significant pre-election planning was undertaken, a practice which has been followed since.

In a 2016 article published by Vox, part of a series of articles written by journalist Richard Skinner on presidential transitions, it was argued that the Carter transition set the mold of modern presidential transitions. It was argued that Carter's early planning, beginning his transition planning prior to even his party's presidential nominating convention, and the form of his transition as a "systematic exercise" marked a step in the evolution what was previously a more informal process that took place over a shorter period of time and involving fewer individuals.
