= James Dykes =

James or Jimmy Dykes may refer to:

- James Oswald Dykes (1835–1912), Scottish clergyman
- James M. Dykes (1916–1966), American politician in Georgia
- Jimmy Dykes (1896–1976), American baseball player and manager
- Jimmy Dykes (basketball) (born 1961), American basketball commentator and coach
- Jimmy Dykes (Scottish footballer) (1916–1974), Scottish footballer
- Jimmy Dykes (Irish footballer) (1898–1976), Irish footballer
- Jimmy Dykes (rugby union), Scottish international rugby union player
- Jimmy Lee Dykes, perpetrator of the 2013 Alabama bunker hostage crisis
