= Hugh Carter Jr. =

American political aide and businessman

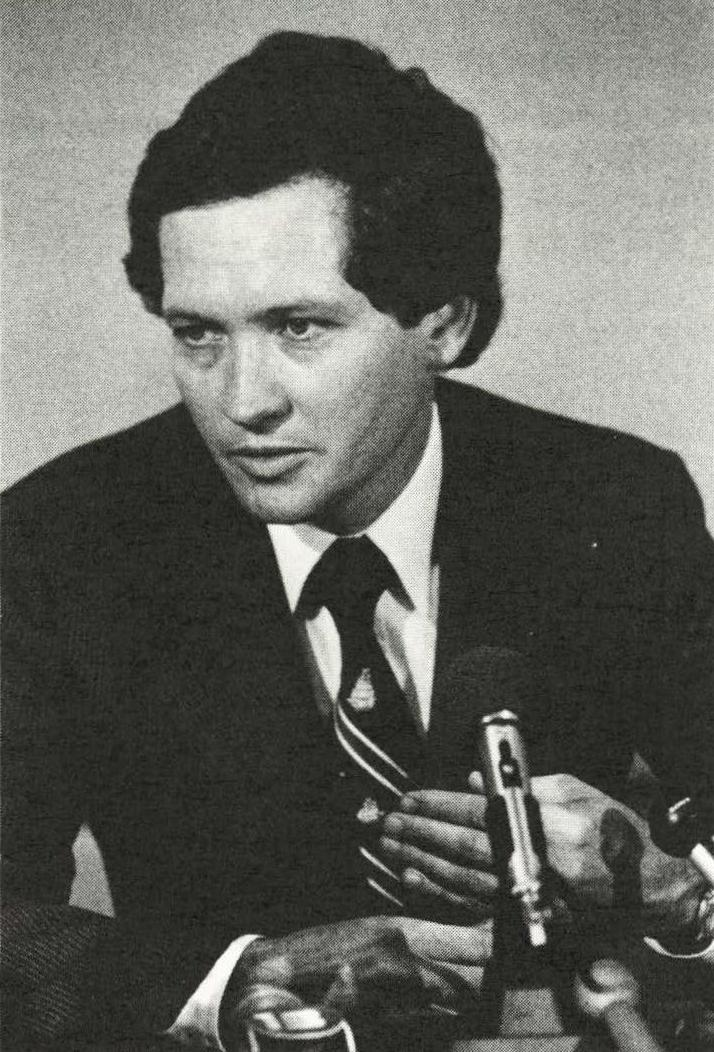
- Carter in 1978
- Born: Hugh Alton Carter Jr. September 29, 1942; Americus, Georgia, U.S.
- Died: July 23, 2023 (aged 80); Tampa, Florida, U.S.
- Education: Georgia Tech; Wharton School
- Occupations: Political aide; businessman
- Father: Hugh Carter
- Relatives: Jimmy Carter (first cousin once removed); Jack Carter (second cousin); Amy Carter (second cousin); Bianca Lawson (second cousin twice removed); Sky Blu (second cousin twice removed)

Hugh Alton Carter Jr. (September 29, 1942 – July 23, 2023), nicknamed "Cousin Cheap" and "Cousin Chief", was an American political aide and businessman.

== Life and career ==
Carter was born in Americus, Georgia, the son of Hugh Sr., a Georgia state senator, and Ruth Carter. He was the grandson of Alton Carter, the brother of James Earl Carter Sr., a Georgia representative. He attended Georgia Institute of Technology, earning his bachelor's degree in industrial engineering in 1964. He also attended Wharton School, earning his master's degree in business administration in 1968. After earning his degrees, he served in the United States Army.

Carter worked at John H. Harland Company.. On January 20, 1977, when his first cousin once removed Jimmy Carter was inaugurated as president of the United States, his cousin asked Carter to work as a special assistant to him, which he accepted. In his role as special assistant, he helped keep control of the White House budget during the Carter administration.

== Death ==
Carter died on July 23, 2023, at his home in Tampa, Florida, at the age of 80.
