= Robert L. Slade Jr. =

American politician (1917–1965)

Member of the Georgia State Senate from the 14th district
- In office 1959–1961
- Preceded by: Clint B. Brannen
- Succeeded by: James M. Dykes

Personal details
- Born: September 11, 1917 Pulaski County, Georgia, U.S.
- Died: May 20, 1965 (aged 47)
- Party: Democratic
- Education: Georgia Military College; Draughns Business College

Robert L. Slade Jr. (September 11, 1917 – May 20, 1965) was an American politician. He served as a Democratic member for the 14th district of the Georgia State Senate.

== Life and career ==
Slade was born in Pulaski County, Georgia. He attended Georgia Military College and Draughns Business College.

Slade served in the Georgia State Senate from 1959 to 1960, representing the 14th district.

Slade died on May 20, 1965, at the age of 47.
