= George Hooks =

American politician (born 1945)

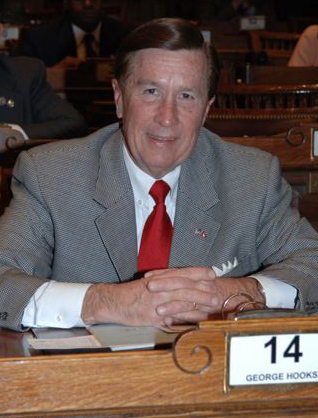

Member of the Georgia State Senate from the 14th district
- In office January 14, 1991 – January 8, 2013
- Preceded by: Lewis H. McKenzie
- Succeeded by: Barry Loudermilk

Personal details
- Born: May 9, 1945 (age 81) Americus, Georgia, U.S.
- Party: Democratic
- Education: Auburn University (BA)
- Occupation: Businessman

George Hooks (born May 9, 1945) is an American politician and Democratic former member of the Georgia State Senate, representing the 14th District from 1991 through 2013. Previously he was a member of the Georgia House of Representatives from 1980 through 1990.

== Background ==
Senator Hooks, a sixth-generation native of Sumter County, graduated from Americus High School and earned a BA degree from Auburn University. While at Auburn he was a member of the Kappa Alpha Order, being initiated in 1966. He also holds an honorary Doctor of Laws (LL.D.) degree from Mercer University.

Senator Hooks currently owns an insurance and real estate firm in Americus.

== Legislative activity ==
=== State House of Representatives ===
A veteran legislator, Hooks served five terms in the Georgia House of Representatives from 1980 to 1990 where he was assistant administration floor leader for former Governor Joe Frank Harris and was responsible for sponsoring and working for passage of the Governor's legislative proposals.

=== State Senate ===
Hooks, a Democrat, is ranking member of the budget-writing Senate Appropriations Committee. Prior to the Republican takeover of the Senate in 2003, he was Chairman of the Committee. He also served on the Senate Rules Committee and chaired the panel until his appointment to the Appropriations post in September 1993. Hooks is a member of the Natural Resources; Ethics (Vice Chair), and Rules. He serves as an ex officio member of the Economic Development, Tourism, and Cultural Affairs Committee. In addition to his standing committee assignments, Hooks serves on a number of interim study committees and state commissions. Senator Hooks co-chairs the joint Senate–House Budgetary Responsibility Oversight Committee, created by the 1993 Georgia General Assembly to help bring about budget reform by strengthening the legislature's role in evaluating the performance of state agencies. He is also a member of the Senate–House Fiscal Affairs Committee which is responsible for considering the transfer of state funds within agencies when the General Assembly is not in session. Hooks serves on the Senate Administrative Affairs Committee which sets policy and oversees the management of Senate operations. He also serves on the joint Senate–House Legislative Services Committee which oversees the Legislative Fiscal Office, the Legislative Budget Office, and the Office of Legislative Counsel. Senator Hooks is a member of the Executive Committee of the Southern Legislative Conference (SLC). He also serves on the Legislative Management Committee of the National Conference of State Legislatures (NCSL), and the Fiscal Oversight and Intergovernmental Affairs Committee.

== Community work ==
Active in community affairs, Hooks was named an Outstanding Young Man of America in 1979, by the State Chamber of Commerce and was selected for Leadership Georgia in 1982. He has been honored as the Legislator of the Year by the Georgia Public Health Association, the Medical Association of Georgia, and the Georgia Hospital Association and as the Soil and Water Conservationist of the Year. He was cited as a "Friend of Medicine" by the Medical Association of Georgia. Hooks received the "Legislative Service Award" for 1991 from both the Georgia Municipal Association and the Association of County Commissioners of Georgia. In both 1997 and 1998, he was honored with the "Speak Up for a Child" awards. He has also received the Friend of Children Award from the Child Advocacy Coalition and has also been cited by the Georgia Association of Educators. In 1997, Senator Hooks was recognized for his support to the Georgia Council for the Hearing Impaired and the Georgia Registry of Interpreters of the Deaf. Last year, Senator Hooks received the "1999 National Legislator of the Year Award" from the American School Counselor Association. The American School Counselor Association honors one legislator a year with this national recognition. The purpose of the award is to recognize state or federal elected officials of government who have demonstrated their belief in and support of school counseling and guidance activities by outstanding work in passing legislation or stimulating future legislation which affects school counseling and guidance. Hooks has also received the John McPherson Berrin Award from the Georgia Historical Society. Hooks is a member and former director of the local Rotary Club and the Americus-Sumter County Chamber of Commerce, attained the rank of Eagle Scout as a youth, and served as a Scout leader. On October 1, 2006, Hooks received the Distinguished Eagle Scout Award from the Boy Scouts of America. Hooks is married to the former Katherine Felder Allen of Atlanta and he has two adult children, Bardin and Mary Ann. Hooks attends the First Baptist Church of Americus.

The 14th Senate District includes Peach, Taylor, Macon, Schley, Sumter, Talbot, Stewart, Upson, and Webster, Dooly, Marion, and Crawford counties.
