= Lewis H. McKenzie =

American politician (1926–1999)

Member of the Georgia State Senate from the 14th district
- In office January 12, 1981 – January 14, 1991
- Preceded by: Hugh Carter
- Succeeded by: George Hooks

Personal details
- Born: March 20, 1926 DeKalb County, Georgia, U.S.
- Died: September 14, 1999 (aged 73)
- Party: Democratic
- Spouse: Christy Armstrong
- Children: 3
- Education: Washington and Lee University

Lewis H. McKenzie (March 20, 1926 – September 14, 1999) was an American politician. He served as a Democratic member for the 14th district of the Georgia State Senate.

== Life and career ==
McKenzie was born in DeKalb County, Georgia. He served in the United States Navy for two years. After that, he attended Washington and Lee University.

In 1965, McKenzie was elected to the Montezuma City Council. The next year, he became mayor of Montezuma, Georgia. In 1981, McKenzie was elected to represent the 14th district of the Georgia State Senate, succeeding Hugh Carter. He served until 1990.

McKenzie died on September 14, 1999, at the age of 73.
