= Stephen H. Hess =

American political scientist (1933–2026)

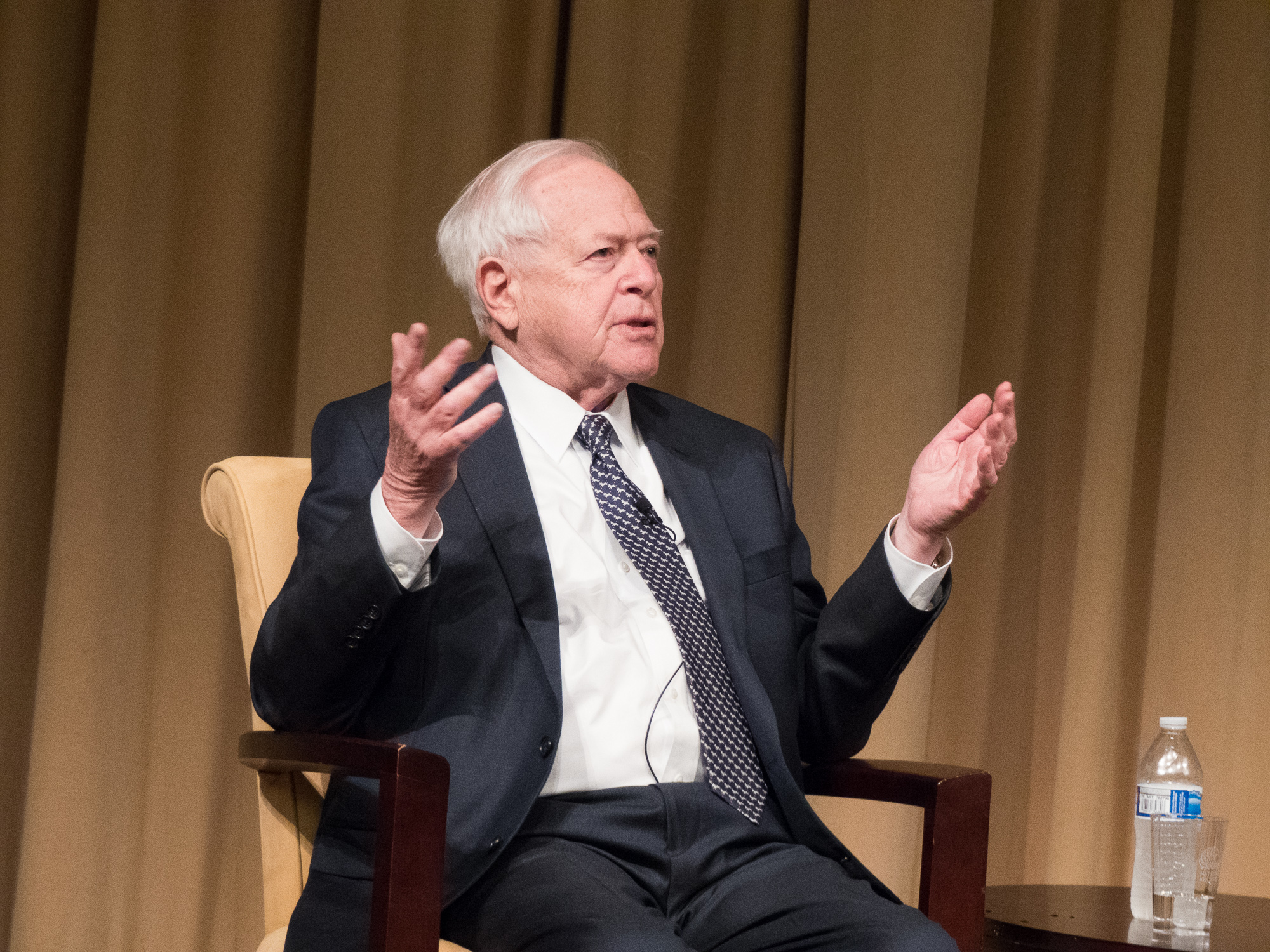
Hess in 2018

Stephen Henry Hess (April 20, 1933 – January 18, 2026) was an American political scientist who was senior fellow emeritus in the Governance Studies program at the Brookings Institution. He studied media, the U.S. presidency, political dynasties and the U.S. government. He first joined Brookings in 1972 and was distinguished research professor of media and public affairs at the George Washington University (2004–2009). He served on Presidents Dwight D. Eisenhower and Richard Nixon's White House staff and as an adviser to Presidents Gerald R. Ford and Jimmy Carter.

== Life and career ==
Hess was born in Manhattan on April 20, 1933. He earned a B.A. in political science at Johns Hopkins University in 1953. Under United States President Dwight D. Eisenhower, Hess was a Special Assistant in the White House Office from February 20, 1959, until January 1961. As a Special Assistant in the White House Office, Hess's principal duty was to draft speeches for the President and other spokesman for the Administration—inside Government and out. Other responsibilities assumed by Hess during his tenure in the White House included: acting as an advisor to the Republican National Committee's Committee on Programs and Progress, helping to gather materials from various governmental departments and agencies for possible inclusion in the 1960 GOP platform, preparing bi-weekly reports concerning congressional action on the budget for legislative leaders' meetings and sitting in on Republican congressional meetings about the 1959 Federal Airport Act.

He also served as a fellow of Government at Harvard University (1979–82), as U.S. Representative to the United Nations General Assembly (1976) and the UNESCO General Conference (1974). From 1969 to 1971, he was the National Chairman of the White House Conference on Children and Youth, and was the Deputy Assistant to the President for Urban Affairs in 1969. He worked in key consultant and adviser capacities for the Russell Sage Foundation, the German Marshall Fund, the Ford Foundation and the U.S. Government.

In 1977, Hess was elected as a fellow of the National Academy of Public Administration.

Hess was a member of the Senior Advisory Committee of the Shorenstein Center for Press, Politics, and Public Policy at the John F. Kennedy School of Government at Harvard University.

His written works include: American Political Cartoons: The Evolution of a National Identity (2010) and Whatever Happened to the Washington Reporters, 1978-2012 (2012), and an autobiography, Bit Player: My Life with Presidents and Ideas (2018) LCCN 2018-289460.

Hess died at his home in Washington, D.C., on January 18, 2026, at the age of 92.

== Sources ==
- CNN.com: Political family names bring shame as well as fame
