= Hugh Carter =

American politician and businessman (1920–1999)

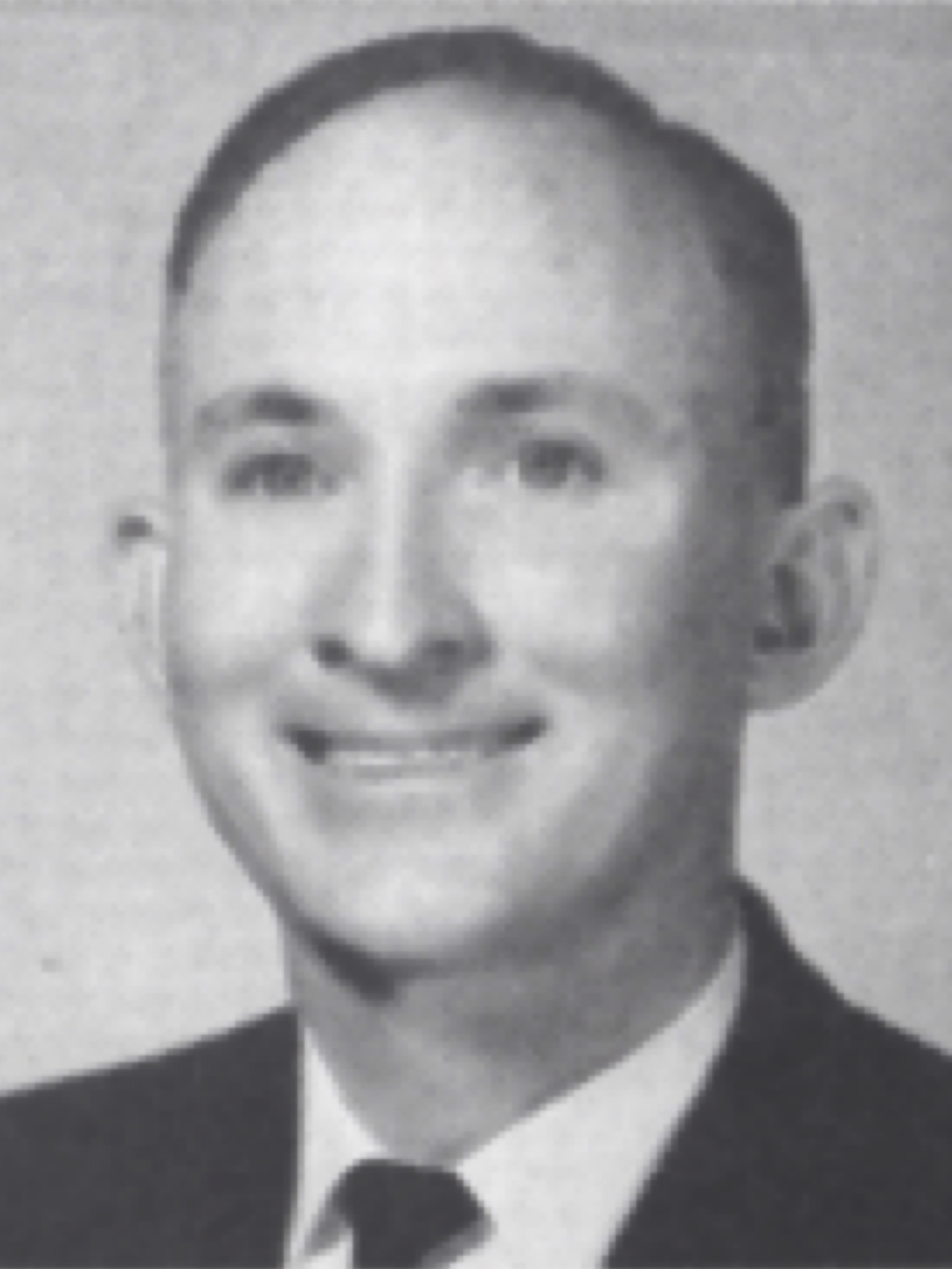
- Official portrait, 1967

Member of the Georgia State Senate from the 14th district
- In office January 9, 1967 – January 12, 1981
- Preceded by: Jimmy Carter
- Succeeded by: Lewis H. McKenzie

Personal details
- Born: Hugh Alton Carter; August 13, 1920 Plains, Georgia, U.S.
- Died: June 24, 1999 (aged 78) Americus, Georgia, U.S.
- Party: Democratic
- Spouse: Ruth Godwin Carter
- Children: 3; including Hugh Jr.
- Relatives: Jimmy Carter (cousin); Berry Gordy (second cousin)
- Education: Georgia Southwestern State University; Georgia Institute of Technology (BS) University of Pennsylvania (MBA)
- Occupation: Politician; businessman

Military service
- Allegiance: United States
- Branch/service: United States Army; U.S. Army Reserve
- Rank: Lieutenant (at end of World War II); Lieutenant Colonel (U.S. Army Reserve)

Hugh Alton Carter Sr. (August 13, 1920 – June 24, 1999) was an American politician and businessman from Georgia. He was also the first cousin of former U.S. president Jimmy Carter.

== Early life and education ==
Born in Plains, Georgia, Carter served in World War II as a United States Army lieutenant seeing combat in Europe. After the war, Carter remained in the reserves and retired as a lieutenant colonel in 1964. Carter graduated from Georgia Southwestern State University, during a time when it was a two-year college, then from the Georgia Institute of Technology with a BS in industrial engineering, and followed by an MBA from the Wharton School of Business at the University of Pennsylvania.

== Political career ==
Carter served seven terms (14 years) in the Georgia State Senate, from 1967 until 1981 and was a Democrat. He represented District 14, and succeeded his cousin future-President Jimmy Carter in that post. He represented eight Georgia rural counties, and served as chairman of the Senate Education Committee and was a senior member of the Appropriations, Rules and Fiscal Affairs Committees.

== Business ventures ==
Carter owned a bait shop and a general (later antique) store. In 1949, Carter started a third business growing fish bait. Originally limited to crickets, he later expanded into worms. By the mid-1950s, Carter was selling worms nationwide and laying claim to the title of "the world's largest worm farmer", producing more than 60 million a year. Carter wrote six pamphlets on worm and cricket farming, the best seller in 1958 was 18 Secrets of Successful Worm Raising The pamphlet originally sold for $1.00. When Carter raised the price to $2.95 sales grew even faster. In 1978, he wrote a book: Cousin Beedie and Cousin Hot: My life with the Carter Family from Plains, Georgia. The book drew the wrath of aunt Lillian Carter and cousin Billy Carter. In the book, he had referred to the President's mother as "domineering", while offering his opinion of Presidential brother, Billy: "He's not a redneck, but can make money as a redneck". Shortly after the book's publication, Carter drew a political opponent. Peanut farmer Malcolm "Chicken" Wishard, was backed by Hugh Carter's aggrieved aunt Lillian and cousin Billy. However, Wishard's campaign slogan "Help the Chicken take the Worm", failed to inspire voters, and Carter was re-elected to another term in the State Senate.

== Later years ==
Carter retired from the State Senate in 1981. His bait growing business suffered declining sales in the 1990s, and he closed it in 1996.

== Death ==
At the age of 78, Carter died in Americus, Georgia, on June 24, 1999.
