= Jody Powell =

White House press secretary to President Jimmy Carter

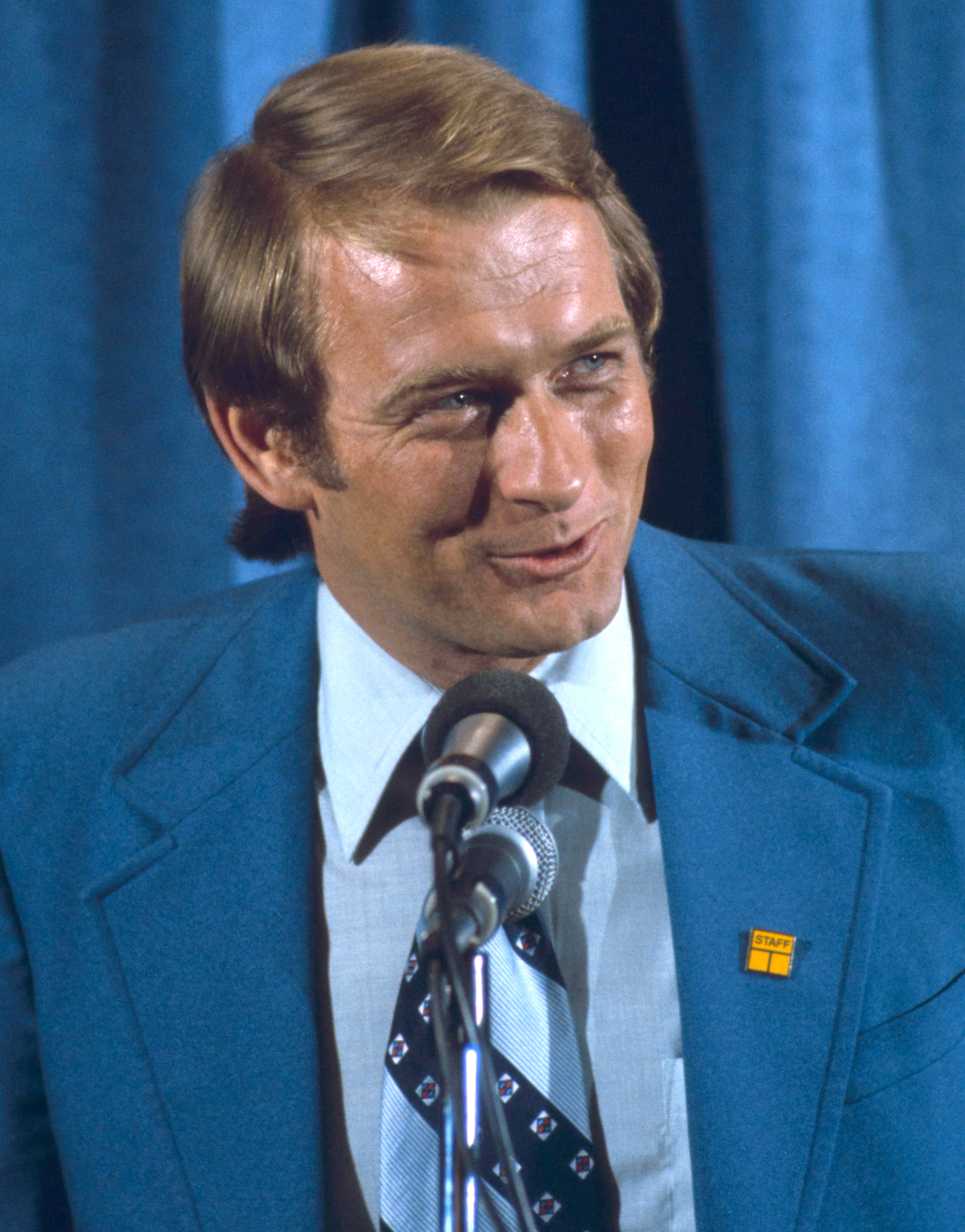

16th White House Press Secretary
- In office January 20, 1977 – January 20, 1981
- President: Jimmy Carter
- Preceded by: Ron Nessen
- Succeeded by: James Brady

Personal details
- Born: Joseph Lester Powell Jr. September 30, 1943 Cordele, Georgia, U.S.
- Died: September 14, 2009 (aged 65) Cambridge, Maryland, U.S.
- Party: Democratic
- Spouse: Nan Jared
- Children: 1
- Education: United States Air Force Academy (attended); Georgia State University (BA); Emory University (MA)

Joseph Lester "Jody" Powell, Jr. (September 30, 1943 – September 14, 2009) was an American political advisor who served as White House press secretary during the presidency of Jimmy Carter. Powell later co-founded a public relations firm.

== Early life and education ==
Born in Cordele, Georgia, Powell grew up on a farm in Vienna, 35 miles east of Carter's home town of Plains. He attended the United States Air Force Academy beginning in 1961, but was expelled three years later for cheating on a history exam. After finishing his Bachelor of Arts at Georgia State University in 1966, Powell enrolled in the doctoral program in political science at Emory University. He earned a Master of Arts in the discipline before leaving the program.

== Career ==
While at Emory in 1968, he sent a paper he had written on southern populism to Jimmy Carter. He began working for the future president, who at the time, was running for governor of Georgia. Powell's first job for Carter was as a volunteer driver, with Powell taking Carter to various campaign stops throughout Georgia. Powell eventually became Carter's close friend and functionally served as his press secretary. Powell eventually quit Emory prior to completing his doctorate to work full-time for Carter.

=== Carter administration ===
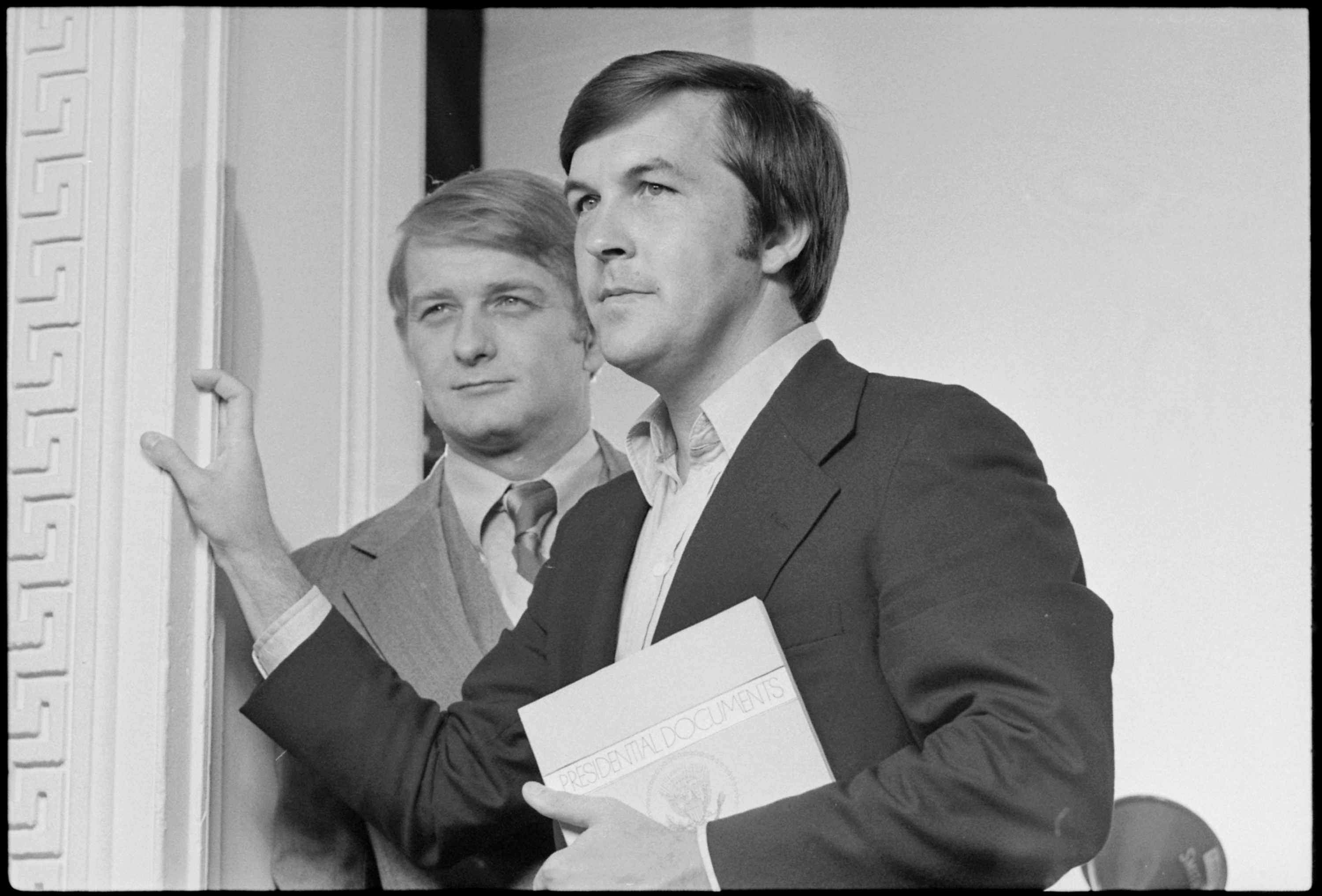
Powell with Hamilton Jordan on right

During Carter's presidential campaign in 1976, Powell was noted for his energy and for calling reporters from wayside pay telephones to make sure they got Carter's record straight. In the run-up to the 1976 presidential election, Time Magazine profiled Powell, anticipating that if Carter were elected, Powell would serve a "dual role as adviser and spokesman" and would become one of the most powerful White House press secretaries in history due to his close relationship with Carter.

After Carter's 1976 election as president, Powell was described as a member of the "Georgia Mafia", a group of close aides from Georgia who moved to high positions in the Carter administration, but who were inexperienced in national politics. Powell and Carter's chief of staff Hamilton Jordan appeared in 1977 as caricatures on the cover of Time in 1977 and were pictured on the cover of Rolling Stone, where they were dubbed Carter's "whiz kids". Powell served as White House press secretary for Carter's entire term as president.

=== Later career ===
In 1985, he published a memoir, The Other Side of the Story, in which he discussed his leak to the Associated Press of the Jimmy Carter rabbit incident, Carter's 1979 encounter with a swamp rabbit, that "was intent on climbing into the Presidential boat".

In 1990, he participated in Ken Burns' PBS documentary miniseries The Civil War, lending his distinctive voice to Confederate figures of the American Civil War, notably Generals Stonewall Jackson, John B. Gordon, and Nathan Bedford Forrest.

Powell and Sheila Tate, former White House press secretary to Nancy Reagan, co-founded Powell Tate, a public relations firm based in Washington, D.C., in 1991. Powell worked as CEO of the firm until his death in 2009. Powell was a member of the Board of Advisors for the Special Operations Warrior Foundation.

== Death ==
Powell died on September 14, 2009, from a heart attack at his home on the Eastern Shore in Maryland.

Political offices
Preceded by Ron Nessen	White House Press Secretary; 1977–1981	Succeeded by James Brady
