= Georgia's 14th Senate district =

American state electoral district

Georgia's 14th State Senate district

- The 14th district since 2023
Senator
Josh McLaurin; D–Sandy Springs
- Demographics: 54.63% White; 16.79% Black; 13.97% Hispanic; 9.46% Asian; 0.13% Native American; 0.04% Hawaiian/Pacific Islander; 0.79% Other; 5.20% Multiracial
- Population (2020) • Voting age • Citizens of voting age: 192,533; 155,340; 132,748

District 14 of the Georgia Senate is a district in northern Metro Atlanta.

Located entirely within Fulton County, the district includes portions of Alpharetta, Johns Creek, Roswell, and Sandy Springs, as well as a small part of northeast Atlanta. The district is home to the headquarters of several major corporations, including Newell Brands, United Parcel Service, Veritiv, and WestRock.

The 14th district was historically located in southwestern Georgia. From 1963 to 1967, it was represented by Jimmy Carter. Carter was elected as a political newcomer, and would later go on to serve as governor of Georgia and president of the United States. Population shifts within Georgia eventually led the 14th district to be moved to the northern suburbs of Atlanta, where it remains today. Since 2023, it has been represented by Democrat Josh McLaurin. President Joe Biden carried the district by 20 points over Donald Trump in 2020, making it one of the few white-majority seats in the state to support Biden.

The current senator is Josh McLaurin, a Democrat from Sandy Springs first elected in 2022.

== History ==
Following the abolition of the county unit system in 1962, Jimmy Carter announced his intention to run for the reconfigured 14th District. His main opponent in the Democratic primary was Homer Moore, a warehouseman who had the support of powerful state Rep. Joe Hurst. Shortly before the election, Hurst informed Moore's campaign manager that he was "getting ready to stuff the ballot box" to secure Moore's victory. On election night, results from Quitman County showed clear indications of fraud. Though 496 votes had been tabulated, it was later revealed that only 333 people had signed in to vote.

Carter sued in state court, drawing attention to hundreds of fake ballots that had been neatly folded and placed in a ballot box. Though he prevailed in court, Moore's name remained on the general election ballot. Ultimately, a judge ordered that the general election for the seat be a write-in contest, which Carter won handily.

In 1966, Carter abandoned this seat to run unsuccessfully for governor. He was succeeded by Hugh Carter, his cousin and a staunch segregationist.

== List of senators ==
Member	Party	Years	Residence	Electoral history	Counties
R. T. Cooper	Democratic	January 1943 – January 1945	Cochran	Elected in 1942.	Bleckley, Dooly, Pulaski
Virgil Clyde Daves	Democratic	January 1945 – January 1947	Vienna	Elected in 1944.	Bleckley, Dooly, Pulaski
E. O. Richardson	Democratic	January 1947 – January 1949	Hawkinsville	Elected in 1946.	Bleckley, Dooly, Pulaski
James M. Dykes	Democratic	January 1949 – January 1951	Cochran	Elected in 1948.	Bleckley, Dooly, Pulaski
Ernest Hayes	Democratic	January 1951 – January 1953	Vienna	Elected in 1950.	Bleckley, Dooly, Pulaski
Pete Pettey	Democratic	January 1953 – January 1955	Hawkinsville	Elected in 1952.	Bleckley, Dooly, Pulaski
James M. Dykes	Democratic	January 1955 – January 1957	Cochran	Elected in 1954.	Bleckley, Dooly, Pulaski
Clint B. Brannen	Democratic	January 1957 – January 1959	Unadilla	Elected in 1956.	Bleckley, Dooly, Pulaski
Robert L. Slade Jr.	Democratic	January 1959 – January 1961	Hawkinsville	Elected in 1958.	Bleckley, Dooly, Pulaski
James M. Dykes	Democratic	January 1961 – January 14, 1963	Cochran	Elected in 1960.	Bleckley, Dooly, Pulaski
Jimmy Carter	Democratic	January 14, 1963 – January 9, 1967	Plains	Elected in 1962. Re-elected in 1964. Retired to run for governor.	Chattahoochee, Quitman, Randolph, Stewart, Sumter, Terrell, Webster
Hugh Carter	Democratic	January 9, 1967 – January 12, 1981	Plains	Elected in 1966. Re-elected in 1968. Re-elected in 1970. Re-elected in 1972. Re-elected in 1974. Re-elected in 1976. Re-elected in 1978. Retired.	Chattahoochee, Quitman, Randolph, Stewart, Sumter, Terrell, Webster
Hugh Carter	Democratic	January 9, 1967 – January 12, 1981	Plains	Elected in 1966. Re-elected in 1968. Re-elected in 1970. Re-elected in 1972. Re-elected in 1974. Re-elected in 1976. Re-elected in 1978. Retired.	Chattahoochee, Randolph, Stewart, Sumter, Terrell, Webster
Hugh Carter	Democratic	January 9, 1967 – January 12, 1981	Plains	Elected in 1966. Re-elected in 1968. Re-elected in 1970. Re-elected in 1972. Re-elected in 1974. Re-elected in 1976. Re-elected in 1978. Retired.	Dougherty (part), Lee, Macon (part), Marion, Schley, Sumter, Taylor, Terrell
Lewis H. McKenzie	Democratic	January 12, 1981 – January 14, 1991	Montezuma	Elected in 1980. Re-elected in 1982. Re-elected in 1984. Re-elected in 1986. Re-elected in 1988. Retired.	Dougherty (part), Lee, Macon (part), Marion, Schley, Sumter, Taylor, Terrell
Lewis H. McKenzie	Democratic	January 12, 1981 – January 14, 1991	Montezuma	Elected in 1980. Re-elected in 1982. Re-elected in 1984. Re-elected in 1986. Re-elected in 1988. Retired.	Lee, Macon, Peach, Schley, Sumter, Taylor, Terrell
George Hooks	Democratic	January 14, 1991 – January 8, 2013	Americus	Elected in 1990. Re-elected in 1992. Re-elected in 1994. Re-elected in 1996. Re-elected in 1998. Re-elected in 2000. Re-elected in 2002. Re-elected in 2004. Re-elected in 2006. Re-elected in 2008. Re-elected in 2010. Resigned on January 8, 2013.	Lee, Macon, Peach, Schley, Sumter, Taylor, Terrell
George Hooks	Democratic	January 14, 1991 – January 8, 2013	Americus	Elected in 1990. Re-elected in 1992. Re-elected in 1994. Re-elected in 1996. Re-elected in 1998. Re-elected in 2000. Re-elected in 2002. Re-elected in 2004. Re-elected in 2006. Re-elected in 2008. Re-elected in 2010. Resigned on January 8, 2013.	Dougherty (part), Lee, Macon, Peach, Schley, Sumter, Taylor
George Hooks	Democratic	January 14, 1991 – January 8, 2013	Americus	Elected in 1990. Re-elected in 1992. Re-elected in 1994. Re-elected in 1996. Re-elected in 1998. Re-elected in 2000. Re-elected in 2002. Re-elected in 2004. Re-elected in 2006. Re-elected in 2008. Re-elected in 2010. Resigned on January 8, 2013.	Chattahoochee (part), Dougherty (part), Harris (part), Lee (part), Macon, Marion, Meriwether (part), Muscogee (part), Quitman, Schley, Stewart, Sumter, Talbot, Taylor, Upson (part), Webster
Vacant from January 8, 2013, to January 14, 2013.					Chattahoochee (part), Dougherty (part), Harris (part), Lee (part), Macon, Marion, Meriwether (part), Muscogee (part), Quitman, Schley, Stewart, Sumter, Talbot, Taylor, Upson (part), Webster
Barry Loudermilk	Republican	January 14, 2013 – September 4, 2013	Cassville	Redistricted from the 52nd district and re-elected in 2012. Resigned on September 4, 2013.	Bartow (part), Cherokee (part), Cobb (part)
Vacant from September 4, 2013, to December 12, 2013.					Bartow (part), Cherokee (part), Cobb (part)
Bruce Thompson	Republican	December 12, 2013 – January 9, 2023	White	Elected to finish Loudermilk's term. Re-elected in 2014. Re-elected in 2016. Re-elected in 2018. Re-elected in 2020. Redistricted to the 52nd district and retired to run for labor commissioner.	Bartow (part), Cherokee (part), Cobb (part)
Josh McLaurin	Democratic	January 9, 2023 – present	Atlanta	Elected in 2022. Re-elected in 2024	Fulton (part)
