= James M. Dykes =

American politician (1916–1966)

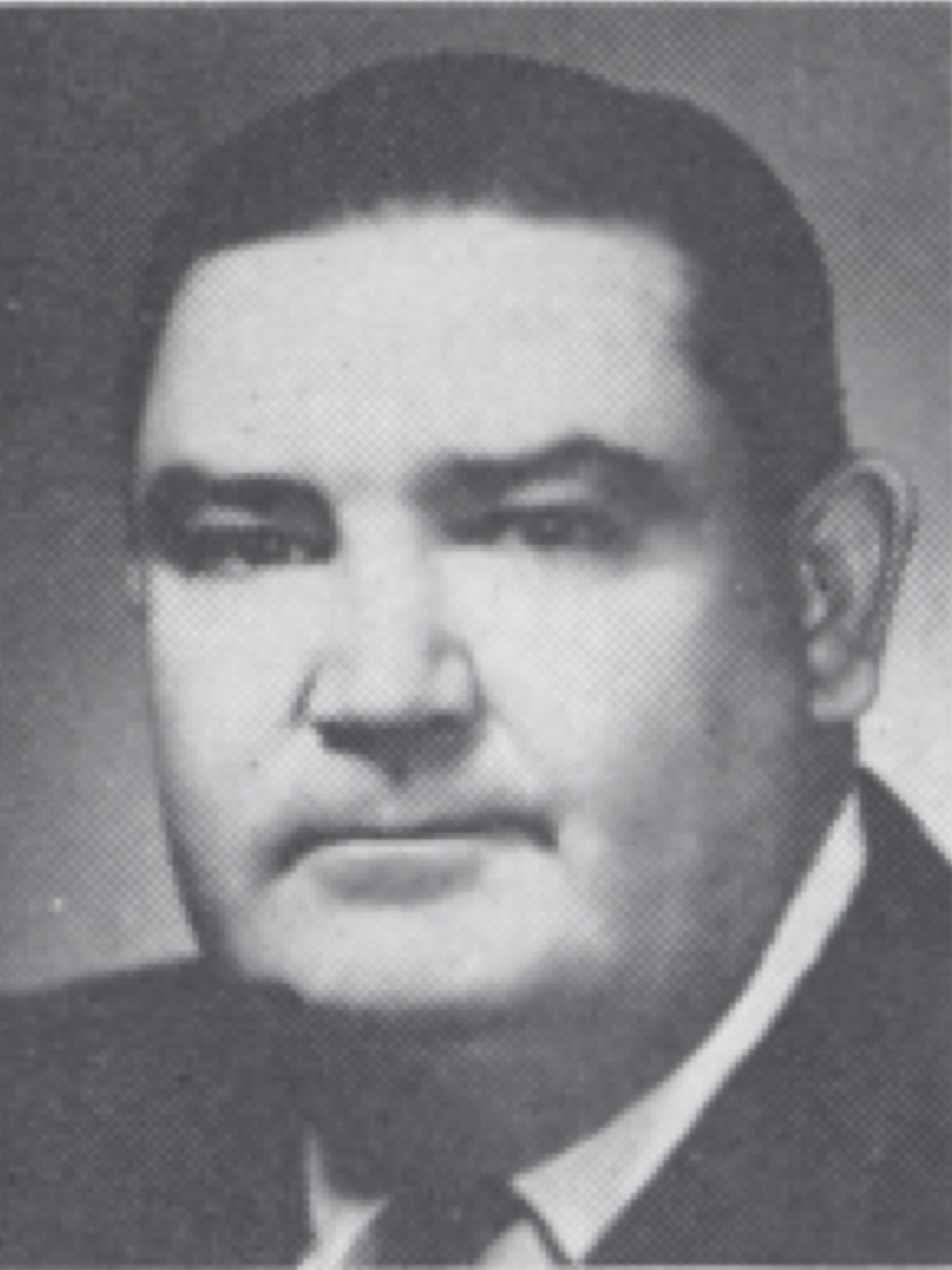
- Official portrait, circa 1961

Member of the Georgia State Senate from the 14th district
- In office January 1961 – January 14, 1963
- Preceded by: Robert L. Slade Jr.
- Succeeded by: Jimmy Carter
- In office January 1955 – January 1957
- Preceded by: Pete Pettey
- Succeeded by: Clint B. Brannen
- In office January 1949 – January 1951
- Preceded by: E. O. Richardson
- Succeeded by: Ernest Hayes

Member of the Georgia House of Representatives from Bleckley County
- In office January 1945 – January 1949
- Preceded by: L. A. Whipple
- Succeeded by: Ben Jessup

Personal details
- Born: James Marion Dykes; May 4, 1916 Bleckley County, Georgia, U.S.
- Died: December 1966 (aged 50) Cochran, Georgia, U.S.
- Party: Democratic
- Spouse: Katherine Crooms

James Marion Dykes (May 4, 1916 – December 1966) was an American politician. He served as a Democratic member of the Georgia House of Representatives. He also served as a member for the 14th district of the Georgia State Senate.

== Life and career ==
Dykes was born in Bleckley County, Georgia. He attended Cochran High School and Honolulu Business School.

Dykes served in the Georgia House of Representatives from 1945 to 1949. He then served three separate terms in the Georgia State Senate, representing the 14th district.

In December 1966, Dykes was found dead in a restroom at his office in Cochran, Georgia with an apparently self-inflicted gunshot wound.
