= Jack Watson (presidential adviser) =

American political aide and corporate strategist

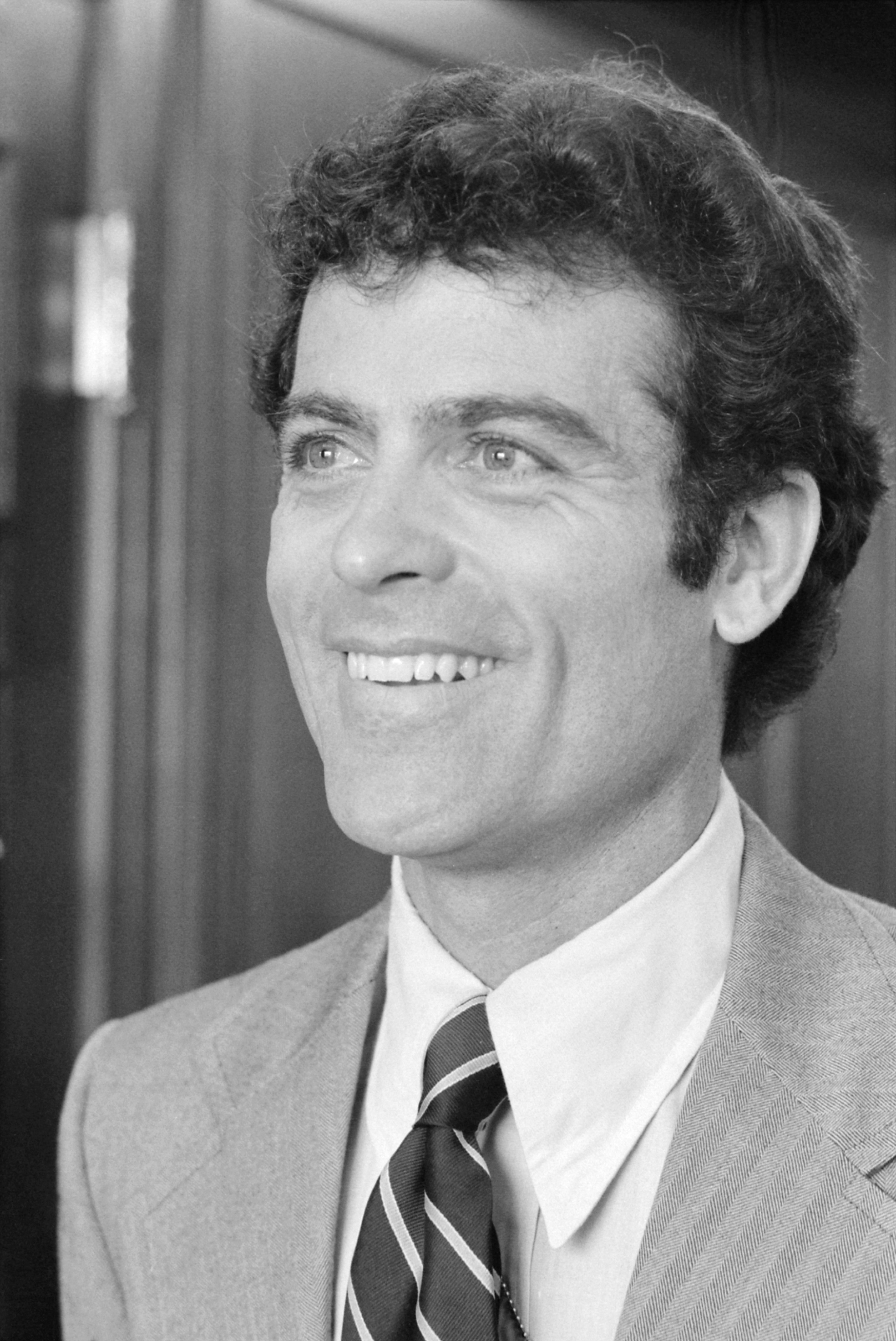
- Watson in 1977

9th White House Chief of Staff
- In office June 11, 1980 – January 20, 1981
- President: Jimmy Carter
- Preceded by: Hamilton Jordan
- Succeeded by: James Baker

White House Cabinet Secretary
- In office January 20, 1977 – June 11, 1980
- President: Jimmy Carter
- Preceded by: James E. Connor
- Succeeded by: Gene Eidenberg

Director of the White House Office of Intergovernmental Affairs
- In office January 20, 1977 – June 11, 1980
- President: Jimmy Carter
- Preceded by: Herbert McCoy
- Succeeded by: Gene Eidenberg

Personal details
- Born: Jack Hearn Watson Jr. October 24, 1938 (age 87) El Paso, Texas, U.S.
- Party: Democratic
- Spouse: Teena Watson (m. 1977)
- Children: 2
- Education: Vanderbilt University (BA); Harvard University (LLB)

Military service
- Allegiance: United States
- Branch/service: United States Marine Corps
- Rank: Captain
- Unit: 1st Force Reconnaissance Company

Jack Hearn Watson Jr. (born October 24, 1938) is an American corporate strategist and political aide who served as White House Chief of Staff to President Jimmy Carter from 1980 to 1981.

== Personal life ==
Watson is a Phi Beta Kappa graduate of Vanderbilt University and received his law degree from Harvard Law School. He served in the U.S. Marine Corps as a Pathfinder and Reconnaissance Team Leader, 1st Force Reconnaissance Company, and left the Marine Corps with the rank of captain. He met his first wife at Vanderbilt, married in 1972 and had two children, Lincoln and Melissa. They divorced and he married Teena Watson in 1977.

== Career ==
Watson served as head of the Carter-Mondale Policy Planning Group in 1976, and later was Director of the Transition Team during the transition of government from President Ford to President Carter. In the Carter administration from 1977 to 1981, he served as Assistant to the President for Intergovernmental Affairs, Secretary to the Cabinet, and White House Chief of Staff. He chaired the President's Interagency Coordinating Council created by Executive Order in 1978 to coordinate implementation of the President's domestic policy.

Watson had earlier been a protege of Charles Kirbo and a highly successful trial lawyer at King & Spalding in Atlanta. He had served as a close aide to Carter during his gubernatorial campaigns and was particularly close to Carter’s mother, “Miss Lillian.” Charismatic, classy and inspirational, Watson characteristically told transition staff at its first meeting in Washington, D.C. following the 1976 election that when working with Executive Branch employees they should view them, not suspiciously, but “as all Carter people.”

== Post–Carter administration ==
From January 1998 to June 2000, he served as Chief Legal Strategist of Monsanto Company.

Political offices
| Preceded by James E. Connor | White House Cabinet Secretary; 1977–1980 | Succeeded by Gene Eidenberg |
| Preceded by Hamilton Jordan | White House Chief of Staff; 1980–1981 | Succeeded by James Baker |
