= Hamilton Jordan =

Chief of Staff to President of the United States Jimmy Carter

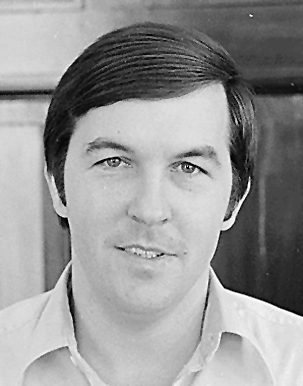
- Jordan in 1977

8th White House Chief of Staff
- In office July 18, 1979 – June 11, 1980
- President: Jimmy Carter
- Preceded by: Dick Cheney (1977)
- Succeeded by: Jack Watson

Personal details
- Born: William Hamilton McWhorter Jordan; September 21, 1944 Charlotte, North Carolina, U.S.
- Died: May 20, 2008 (aged 63) Atlanta, Georgia, U.S.
- Party: Democratic
- Education: University of Georgia (BA)

William Hamilton McWhorter Jordan (/ˈdʒərdən/; September 21, 1944 – May 20, 2008) was an American politician who served as Chief of Staff to President of the United States Jimmy Carter.

== Early life ==
Jordan was born in Charlotte, North Carolina, the son of Adelaide (McWhorter) and Richard Lawton Jordan. He grew up in Albany, Georgia. He attended the University of Georgia in Athens, Georgia, where he was a member of the Phi Delta Theta fraternity. Jordan graduated with an A.B. in political science in 1967. After being disqualified from military service due to leg problems, he worked as a civilian volunteer in Vietnam during the war there, assisting refugees.

== Political career ==
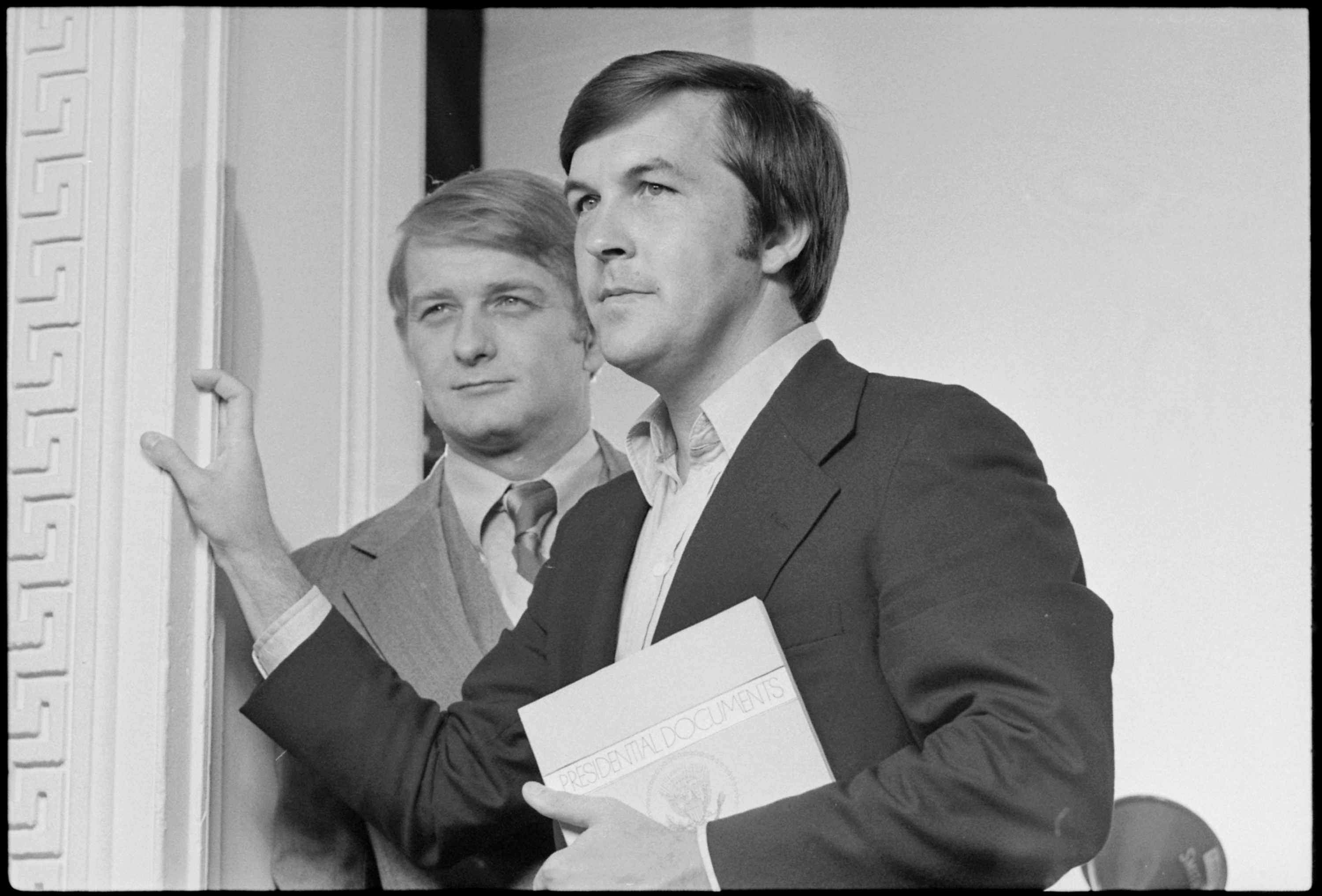
Jordan with Jody Powell on left

In 1970, at the age of 26, Jordan ran Jimmy Carter's successful gubernatorial campaign, which included a Democratic primary election fight against former Governor Carl Sanders and a less eventful general election against the Republican Hal Suit. While serving as Governor Carter's executive assistant, Jordan wrote a lengthy memorandum detailing a strategy for winning the 1976 Democratic Primary. Years later, Jordan's memo served as the "game plan" for Carter's 1976 presidential bid.

Jordan was a key advisor and strategist for Carter during the 1976 presidential campaign and during Carter's administration, serving as White House Chief of Staff in 1979–1980 (Carter, who took office in 1977, had previously not seen the need formally to appoint an aide to such a post). Jordan played a powerful role in the formulation of election strategies and government policies.

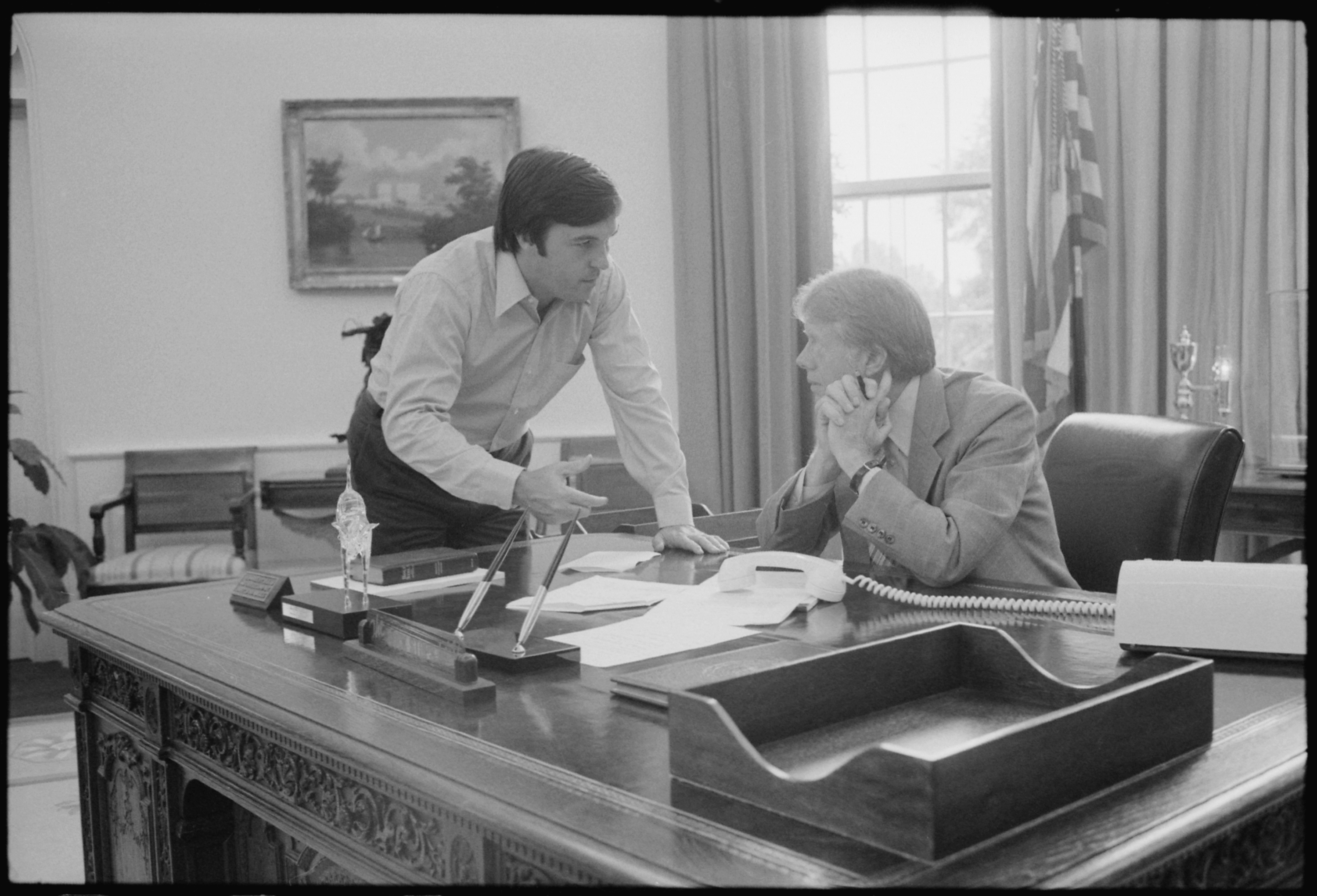
Hamilton Jordan consults with Jimmy Carter in the Oval Office, August 24, 1977

In 1976 Jordan's youth and casual style gave him a media reputation as a fun-loving, partying, unsophisticated "good ole boy." This turned into a problem during the last year of the Carter administration, when Jordan became a lightning rod for critics of the President across the political spectrum. The media repeated rumors of coarse and even criminal behavior by Jordan, including supposed cocaine usage and anonymous sex at the infamous Studio 54 disco in New York City. Though extensive legal investigations failed to substantiate any of the rumors, Jordan later recalled this as a particularly painful time in his life.

According to one often repeated story from this period, Jordan stared at the breasts of the Egyptian ambassador's wife at a Washington reception and remarked, "I have always wanted to see the pyramids". The story was told in various versions, all based on anonymous sources. Jordan denied it ever took place in his memoir No Such Thing as a Bad Day. CBS News anchor Walter Cronkite later recalled that the network's coverage of the cocaine allegations against Jordan was the "worst story he had ever broadcast."

Jordan's associate, Timothy Kraft, the 1980 Carter campaign manager, was accused of cocaine use at a party in New Orleans and left the campaign some five weeks before the general election. He was cleared in 1981 by special prosecutor Gerald J. Gallinghouse, a Republican former U.S. Attorney who had earlier prosecuted corruption in the Louisiana state government.

In 1986, Jordan ran for the Democratic nomination for one of Georgia's seats in the United States Senate. He lost the primary to Representative Wyche Fowler, who went on to win the general election against the Republican incumbent Mack Mattingly.

In 1992, he became a high-level staffer on the presidential campaign of independent candidate Ross Perot. In later years he served both as a member of the founders council and as an important public advocate for Unity08, a political movement focused on reforming the American two party system.

== Later life ==
Jordan was chief executive of the Association of Tennis Professionals when they took control of the professional men's world tennis tour in 1990, replacing the Men's Tennis Council. His nephew, R. Lawton Jordan, served as Deputy Assistant to the President and Deputy Director of the White House Office of Intergovernmental Affairs during Bill Clinton's administration. Jordan authored the book No Such Thing as a Bad Day in 2000.

== Personal life ==
He and his wife Dorothy, a pediatric oncology nurse, founded a camp for children with cancer – Camp Sunshine – and a camp for children with diabetes – Camp Kudzu – in Georgia. He was an honorary board member of the Multiple Myeloma Research Foundation. An earlier marriage, to Nancy Konigsmark, ended in divorce.

His son, Hamilton Jordan Jr., is a member of the experimental metal band Genghis Tron. His two other children, Kathleen and Alex, both attended Kenyon College. Alex, Kathleen and Hamilton Jr. helped to complete their father's memoir about growing up in the 1950s South, A Boy From Georgia. Jordan wrote about 90% of the work, with Kathleen, a TV/film comedy executive, penning the balance. Jordan's original title for the memoir was Meet the Gottheimers, a reference to the fact that he had discovered, not until he was in college, that his maternal grandmother had been Jewish. The memoir was submitted to possible publishers, with the University of Georgia Press announcing in 2015 that it would publish the book that fall.

== Death ==
Jordan died on May 20, 2008, aged 63, from peritoneal mesothelioma, which he believed resulted from his exposure to asbestos during his volunteer service in Vietnam. He had survived several other forms of cancer earlier in his life, including diffuse histiocytic non-Hodgkin lymphoma, melanoma, and prostate cancer.

== Popular culture ==
Jordan was portrayed by Kyle Chandler in the 2012 film Argo.

In the 2026 Judith Heumann biopic, Being Heumann, which covers the Section 504 sit-ins, he is portrayed by Joe Cobden.

Political offices
Vacant Title last held by Dick Cheney	White House Chief of Staff; 1979–1980	Succeeded by Jack Watson
