= The National Bank of Georgia =

The National Bank of Georgia may refer to:

- The National Bank of Georgia (U.S.), a commercial bank located in the Athens, Georgia in the United States
- National Bank of Georgia, the central bank of the country of Georgia
