= Presidency of Jimmy Carter =

U.S. presidential administration from 1977 to 1981

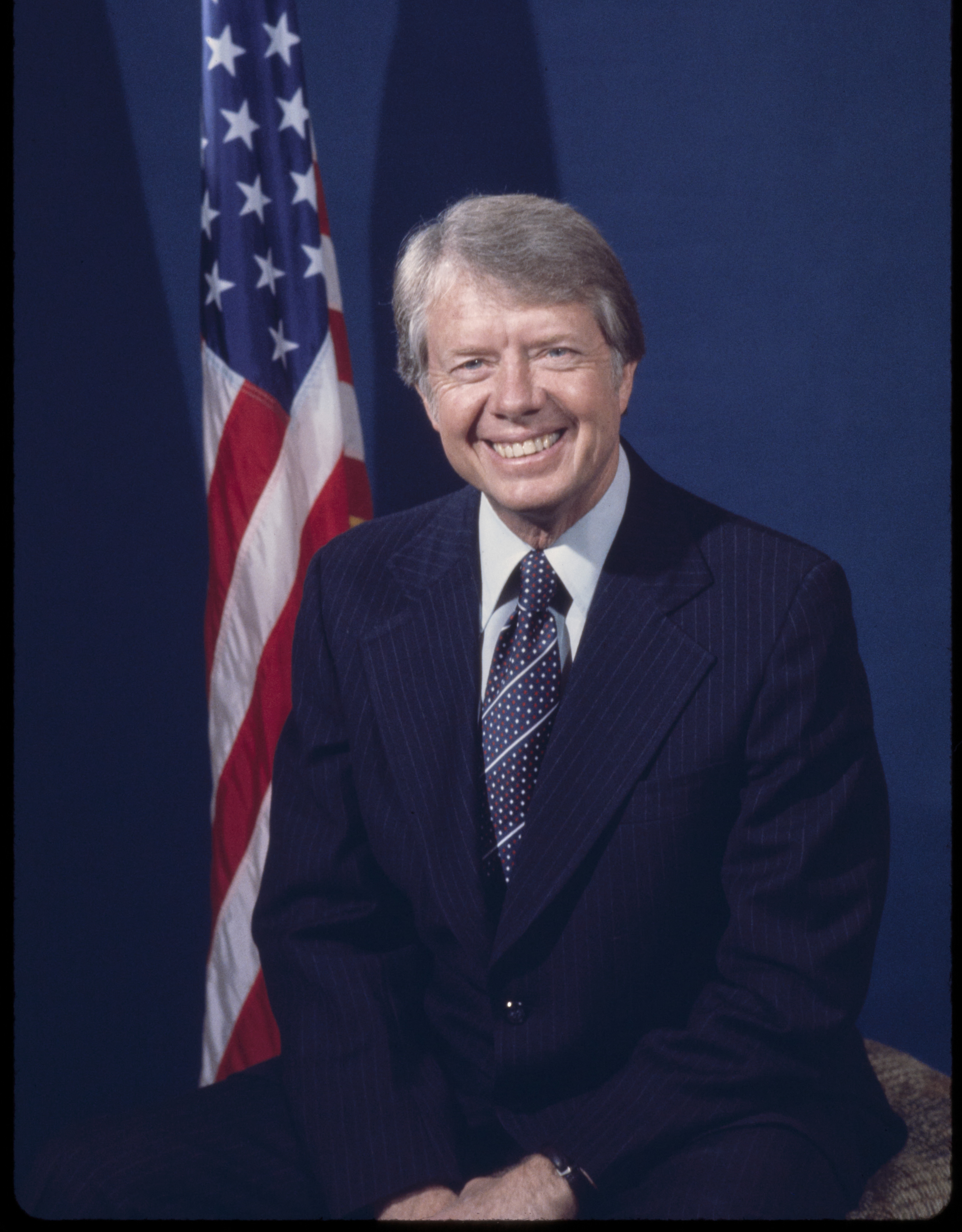
- Official portrait, c. 1977–1981
- Presidency of Jimmy Carter; January 20, 1977 – January 20, 1981
- Vice President: Walter Mondale
- Cabinet: See list
- Party: Democratic
- Election: 1976
- Seat: White House
- Seal of the President

Jimmy Carter's tenure as the 39th president of the United States began with his inauguration on January 20, 1977, and ended on January 20, 1981. Carter, a Democrat from Georgia, took office after defeating the Republican incumbent president Gerald Ford in the 1976 presidential election. His presidency ended following his re-election defeat to the Republican nominee Ronald Reagan in the 1980 presidential election. At the time of his death at the age of 100, he was the oldest living, longest-lived and longest-married president, and had the longest post-presidency.

Carter took office during a period of "stagflation", as the economy experienced a combination of high inflation and slow economic growth. His budgetary policies centered on taming inflation by reducing deficits and government spending. Responding to energy concerns that had persisted through much of the 1970s, his administration enacted a national energy policy designed for long-term energy conservation and the development of alternative resources. In the short term, the country was beset by an energy crisis in 1979 which was overlapped by a recession in 1980. Carter sought reforms to the country's welfare, health care, and tax systems, but was largely unsuccessful, partly due to poor relations with Democrats in Congress.

Carter reoriented U.S. foreign policy towards an emphasis on human rights. He continued the conciliatory late Cold War policies of his predecessors, normalizing relations with China and pursuing further Strategic Arms Limitation Talks with the Soviet Union. In an effort to end the Arab–Israeli conflict, he helped arrange the Camp David Accords between Israel and Egypt. Through the Torrijos–Carter Treaties, Carter guaranteed the eventual transfer of the Panama Canal to Panama. Denouncing the Soviet invasion of Afghanistan in 1979, he reversed his conciliatory policies towards the Soviet Union and began a period of military build-up and diplomatic pressure. Pulling out of the Moscow Olympics was one of his tactics.

The final fifteen months of Carter's presidential tenure were marked by several additional major crises, including the Iran hostage crisis and economic malaise. Ted Kennedy, a prominent liberal Democrat who protested Carter's opposition to a national health insurance system, challenged Carter in the 1980 Democratic primaries. Boosted by public support for his policies in late 1979 and early 1980, Carter rallied to defeat Kennedy and win re-nomination. He lost the 1980 presidential election in a landslide to Republican nominee Ronald Reagan. Polls of historians and political scientists generally rank Carter as a below-average president, although his post-presidential activities are viewed more favorably.

== 1976 election ==
1976 Electoral College vote results

Carter was elected as the Governor of Georgia in 1970, and during his four years in office he earned a reputation as a progressive, racially moderate Southern governor. Observing George McGovern's success in the 1972 Democratic primaries, Carter came to believe that he could win the 1976 Democratic presidential nomination by running as an outsider unconnected to establishment politicians in Washington. Carter declared his candidacy for the 1976 Democratic presidential nomination in December 1974 and swore "to never lie to the American people." As Democratic leaders such as 1968 nominee Hubert Humphrey, Senator Walter Mondale of Minnesota, and Senator Ted Kennedy of Massachusetts declined to enter the race, there was no clear favorite in the Democratic primaries. Mo Udall, Sargent Shriver, Birch Bayh, Fred R. Harris, Terry Sanford, Henry M. Jackson, Lloyd Bentsen, and George Wallace all sought the nomination, and many of these candidates were better known than Carter.

Carter sought to appeal to various groups in the party; his advocacy for cutting defense spending and reining in the CIA appealed to liberals, while his emphasis on eliminating government waste appealed to conservatives. Carter won the most votes of any candidate in the Iowa caucus, and he dominated media coverage in advance of the New Hampshire primary, which he also won. Carter's subsequent victory over Wallace in the Florida and North Carolina primaries eliminated Carter's main rival in the South. With a victory over Jackson in the Pennsylvania primary, Carter established himself as the clear front-runner. Despite the late entrance of Senator Frank Church and Governor Jerry Brown into the race, Carter clinched the nomination on the final day of the primaries. The 1976 Democratic National Convention proceeded harmoniously and, after interviewing several candidates, Carter chose Mondale as his running mate. The selection of Mondale was well received by many liberal Democrats, many of whom had been skeptical of Carter.

The Republicans experienced a contested convention that ultimately nominated incumbent President Gerald Ford, who had succeeded to the presidency in 1974 after the resignation of Richard Nixon due to the latter's involvement in the Watergate scandal. With the Republicans badly divided, and with Ford facing questions over his competence as president, polls taken in August 1976 showed Carter with a 15-point lead. In the general election campaign, Carter continued to promote a centrist agenda, seeking to define new Democratic positions in the aftermath of the tumultuous 1960s. Above all, Carter attacked the political system, defining himself as an "outsider" who would reform Washington in the post-Watergate era. In response, Ford attacked Carter's supposed "fuzziness", arguing that Carter had taken vague stances on major issues. Carter and President Ford faced off in three televised debates during the 1976 election, the first such debates since 1960. Ford was generally viewed as the winner of the first debate, but he made a major gaffe in the second debate when he stated there was "no Soviet domination of Eastern Europe." (Note: Ford meant to say that the United States did not accept the Soviet domination of Eastern Europe.) The gaffe put an end to Ford's late momentum, and Carter helped his own campaign with a strong performance in the third debate. Polls taken just before election day showed a very close race.

Carter won the election with 50.1% of the popular vote and 297 electoral votes, while Ford won 48% of the popular vote and 240 electoral votes. The 1976 presidential election represents the lone Democratic presidential election victory between the elections of 1964 and 1992. Carter fared particularly well in the Northeast and the South, while Ford swept the West and won much of the Midwest. In the concurrent congressional elections, Democrats increased their majorities in both the House and Senate.

== Transition ==
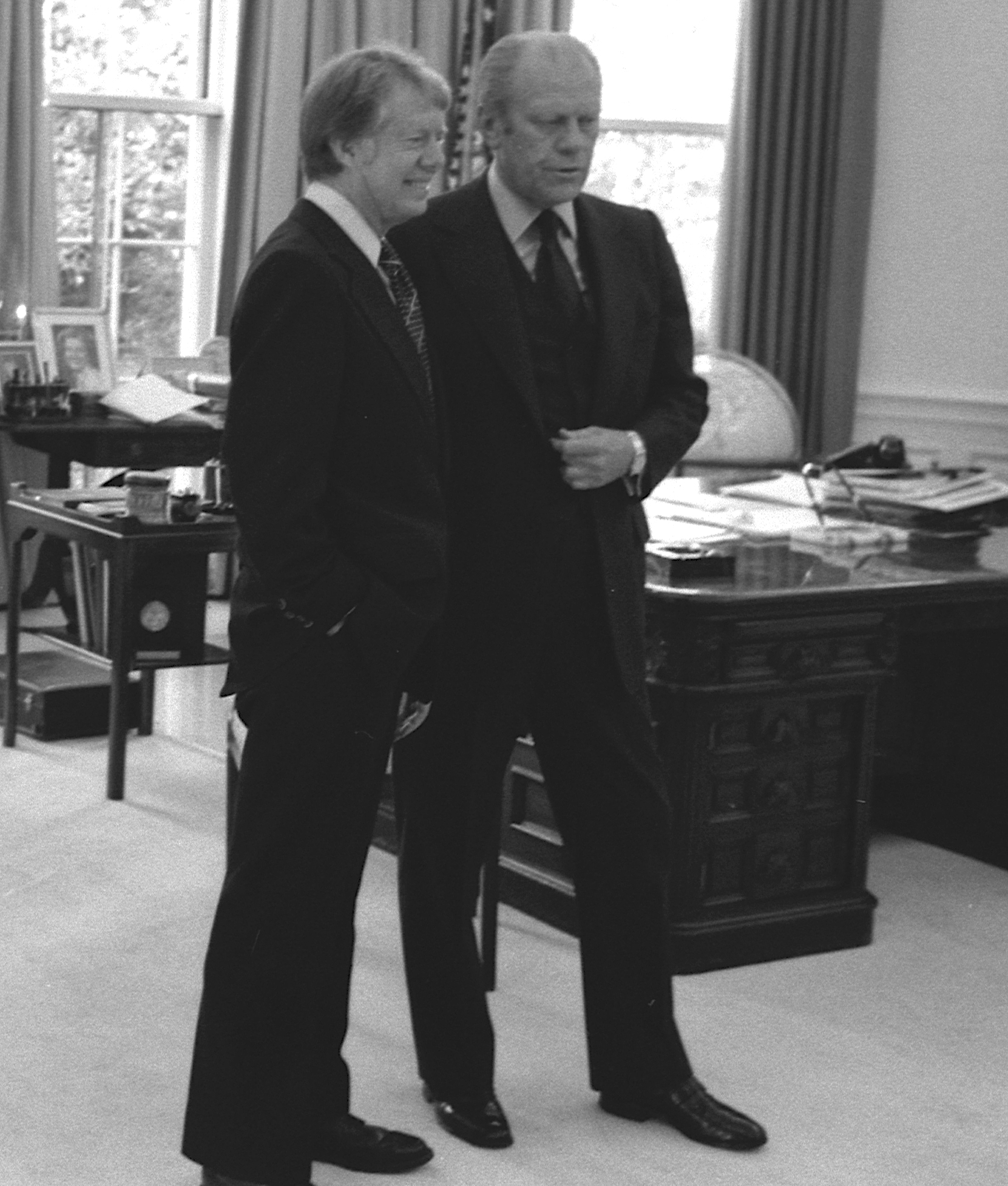
Outgoing President Gerald Ford and President-elect Jimmy Carter in the Oval Office on November 22, 1976

Preliminary planning for Carter's presidential transition had already been underway for months before his election. Carter was the first presidential candidate to allot significant funds and a significant number of personnel to a pre-election transition planning effort, which subsequently would become standard practice. Carter made an innovation with his presidential transition that would influence all subsequent presidential transitions, taking a methodical approach to his transition, and having a larger and more formal operation than past presidential transitions had.

== Inauguration ==
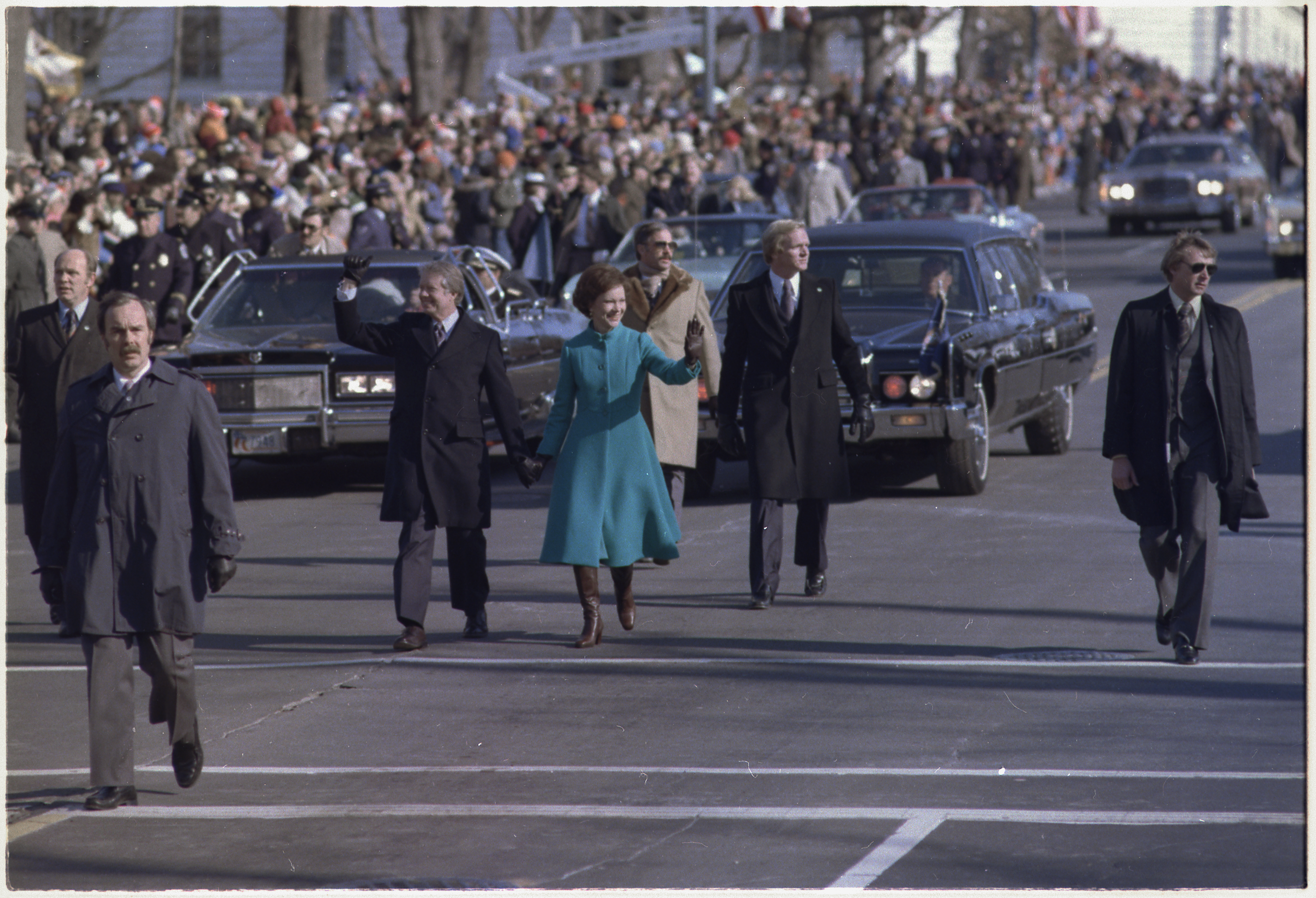
President Jimmy Carter and Rosalynn Carter walk down Pennsylvania Avenue during the inauguration.

In his inaugural address, Carter said, "We have learned that more is not necessarily better, that even our great nation has its recognized limits, and that we can neither answer all questions nor solve all problems." Carter had campaigned on a promise to eliminate the trappings of the "Imperial Presidency," and began taking action according to that promise on Inauguration Day, breaking with recent history and security protocols by walking from the Capitol to the White House in his inaugural parade. His first steps in the White House went further in this direction: Carter cut the size of the 500-member White House staff by one-third and reduced the perks for the president and cabinet members. He also fulfilled a campaign promise by issuing a "full complete and unconditional pardon" (amnesty) for Vietnam War-era draft evaders.

== Administration ==
Carter cabinet
Office	Name	Term
President	Jimmy Carter	1977–1981
Vice President	Walter Mondale	1977–1981
Secretary of State	Cyrus Vance	1977–1980
Edmund Muskie	1980–1981
Secretary of the Treasury	W. Michael Blumenthal	1977–1979
G. William Miller	1979–1981
Secretary of Defense	Harold Brown	1977–1981
Attorney General	Griffin Bell	1977–1979
Benjamin Civiletti	1979–1981
Secretary of the Interior	Cecil Andrus	1977–1981
Secretary of Agriculture	Robert Bergland	1977–1981
Secretary of Commerce	Juanita M. Kreps	1977–1979
Philip Klutznick	1980–1981
Secretary of Labor	Ray Marshall	1977–1981
Secretary of Health, Education, and Welfare	Joseph A. Califano Jr.	1977–1979
Patricia Roberts Harris*	1979–1980
Secretary of Health and Human Services	Patricia Roberts Harris*	1980–1981
Secretary of Housing and Urban Development	Patricia Roberts Harris	1977–1979
Maurice "Moon" Landrieu	1979–1981
Secretary of Transportation	Brock Adams	1977–1979
Neil Goldschmidt	1979–1981
Secretary of Energy	James R. Schlesinger	1977–1979
Charles Duncan Jr.	1979–1981
Secretary of Education	Shirley Hufstedler*	1979–1981
Director of the Office of Management and Budget	Bert Lance	1977
James T. McIntyre	1977–1981
United States Trade Representative	Robert S. Strauss	1977–1979
Reubin Askew	1979–1980
Ambassador to the United Nations	Andrew Young	1977–1979
Donald McHenry	1979–1981
National Security Advisor	Zbigniew Brzezinski	1977–1981
Chair of the Council of Economic Advisers	Charles Schultze	1977–1981
- *The Department of Health, Education and Welfare (HEW) was renamed the Department of Health and Human Services (HHS) in 1980, when its education functions were transferred to the newly created Department of Education under the Department of Education Organization Act (1979).

Though Carter had campaigned against Washington insiders, many of his top appointees had served in previous presidential administrations. Secretary of State Cyrus Vance, Secretary of Defense Harold Brown, and Secretary of the Treasury W. Michael Blumenthal had been high-ranking officials in the Kennedy and Johnson administrations. Other notable appointments included Charles Schultze as Chairman of the Council of Economic Advisers, former Secretary of Defense James R. Schlesinger as a presidential assistant on energy issues, federal judge Griffin Bell as Attorney General, and Patricia Roberts Harris, the first African-American woman to serve in the cabinet, as Secretary of Housing and Urban Development.

Carter appointed several close associates from Georgia to staff the Executive Office of the President. He initially offered the position of White House Chief of Staff to two of his advisers, Hamilton Jordan and Charles Kirbo, but both declined. Carter decided not to have a chief of staff, instead implementing a system in which cabinet members would have more direct access to the president. Bert Lance was selected to lead the Office of Management and Budget, while Jordan became a key aide and adviser. Other appointees from Georgia included Jody Powell as White House Press Secretary, Jack Watson as cabinet secretary, and Stuart E. Eizenstat as head of the Domestic Policy Staff. To oversee the administration's foreign policy, Carter relied on several members of the Trilateral Commission, including Vance and National Security Adviser Zbigniew Brzezinski. Brzezinski emerged as one of Carter's closest advisers, and Carter made use of both the National Security Council and Vance's State Department in developing and implementing foreign policy. The hawkish Brzezinski clashed frequently with Vance, who pushed for detente with the Soviet Union.

Vice President Mondale served as a key adviser on both foreign and domestic issues. First Lady Rosalynn Carter emerged as an important part of the administration, sitting in on several Cabinet meetings and serving as a sounding board, advisor, and surrogate for the president. She traveled abroad to negotiate foreign policy, and some polling found that she was tied with Mother Teresa as the most admired woman in the world.

Carter shook up the White House staff in mid-1978, bringing in advertising executive Gerald Rafshoon to serve as the White House Communications Director and Anne Wexler to lead the Office of Public Liaison. Carter implemented broad personnel changes in the White House and cabinet in mid-1979. Five cabinet secretaries left office, including Blumenthal, Bell, and Joseph Califano, the Secretary of Health, Education, and Welfare. Jordan was selected as the president's first chief of staff, while Alonzo L. McDonald, formerly of McKinsey & Company, became the White House staff director. Federal Reserve Chairman G. William Miller replaced Blumenthal as Secretary of the Treasury, Benjamin Civiletti took office as Attorney General, and Charles Duncan Jr. became Secretary of Energy. After Vance resigned in 1980, Carter appointed Edmund Muskie, a well-respected Senator with whom Carter had developed friendly relations, to serve as Secretary of State.

== Judicial appointments ==
Among presidents who served at least one full term, Carter was the only one who never made an appointment to the Supreme Court. Carter appointed 56 judges to the United States Courts of Appeals, and 203 judges to the United States district courts. Two of his circuit court appointees – Stephen Breyer and Ruth Bader Ginsburg – were later promoted to the Supreme Court by Bill Clinton. Carter was the first president to make demographic diversity a key priority in the selection of judicial nominees. During Carter's presidency, the number of female circuit court judges increased from one to twelve, the number of non-white male circuit judges increased from six to thirteen, the number of female district court judges increased from four to 32, and the number of non-white male district court judges increased from 23 to 55. Carter appointed the first female African-American circuit court judge, Amalya Lyle Kearse, the first Hispanic circuit court judge, Reynaldo Guerra Garza, and the first female Hispanic district court judge, Carmen Consuelo Cerezo. Federal Judicial Center data shows that Carter appointed more women (41) and people of color (57) than had been appointed by all past presidents combined (10 women and 35 people of color).

== Domestic affairs ==
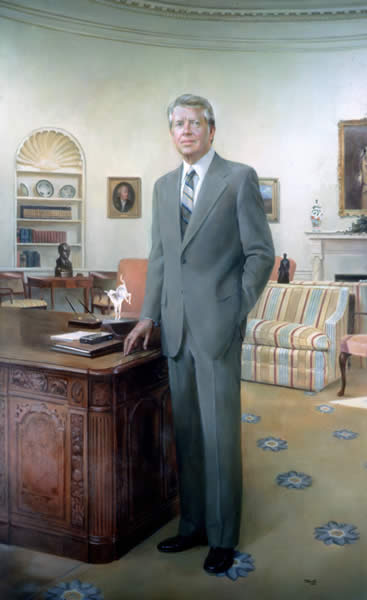
Robert Templeton's portrait of President Carter, displayed in the National Portrait Gallery, Washington, D.C.

President Carter was not a product of the New Deal traditions of liberal Northern Democrats. Instead he traced his ideological background to the Progressive Era. He was thus much more conservative than the dominant liberal wing of the party could accept. British historian Iwan Morgan argues:

Carter traced his political values to early twentieth-century southern progressivism with its concern for economy and efficiency in government and compassion for the poor. He described himself as a fiscal conservative, but liberal on matters like civil rights, the environment, and "helping people to overcome handicaps to lead fruitful lives," an ideological construct that appeared to make him the legatee of Dwight D. Eisenhower rather than Franklin D. Roosevelt.

=== Relations with Congress ===
Carter successfully campaigned as a Washington "outsider" critical of both President Gerald Ford and the Democratic Congress; as president, he continued this theme. This refusal to play by the rules of Washington contributed to the Carter administration's difficult relationship with Congress. After the election, the President demanded the power to reorganize the executive branch, alienating powerful Democrats like Speaker Tip O'Neill and Jack Brooks. During the Nixon administration, Congress had passed a series of reforms that removed power from the president, and most members of Congress were unwilling to restore that power even with a Democrat now in office. (Note: The War Powers Resolution and the Congressional Budget and Impoundment Control Act of 1974 were among the laws passed by Congress under Nixon and Ford to restrict the president's power; Congress also created the Congressional Budget Office and began to take a more active role in foreign policy.) Unreturned phone calls, verbal insults, and an unwillingness to trade political favors soured many on Capitol Hill and affected the president's ability to enact his agenda. In many cases, these failures of communication stemmed not from intentional neglect, but rather from poor organization of the administration's congressional liaison functions. President Carter attempted to woo O'Neill, Senate Majority Leader Robert Byrd, and other members of Congress through personal engagement, but he was generally unable to rally support for his programs through these meetings. Carter also erred in focusing on too many priorities at once, especially in the first months of his presidency. Democrats in Congress were displeased with his moralistic, executive-oriented, rational approach to decision-making and his reluctance to accept standard congressional methods of compromise, patronage, and log-rolling.

A few months after his term started, Carter issued a "hit list" of 19 projects that he claimed were "pork barrel" spending. He said that he would veto any legislation that contained projects on this list. Congress responded by passing a bill that combined several of the projects that Carter objected to with economic stimulus measures that Carter favored. Carter chose to sign the bill, but his criticism of the alleged "pork barrel" projects cost him support in Congress. These struggles set a pattern for Carter's presidency, and he would frequently clash with Congress for the remainder of his tenure.

=== Budget policies ===
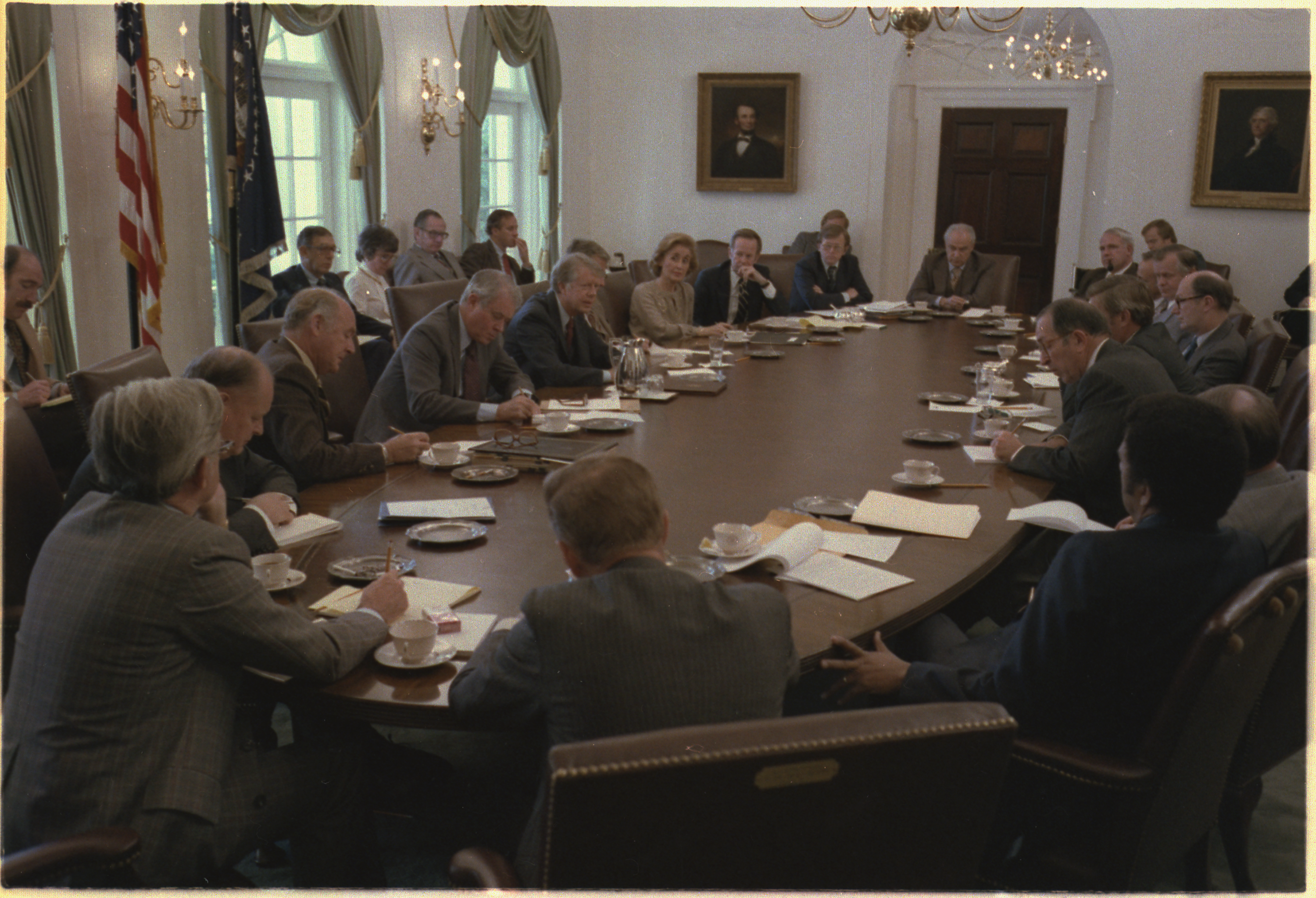
Jimmy Carter and his cabinet in 1978

On taking office, Carter proposed an economic stimulus package that would give each citizen a $50 tax rebate, cut corporate taxes by $900 million, and increase spending on public works. The limited spending involved in the package reflected Carter's fiscal conservatism, as he was more concerned with avoiding inflation and balancing the budget than addressing unemployment. Carter's resistance to higher federal spending drew attacks from many members of his own party, who wanted to lower the unemployment rate through federal public works projects. Carter signed several measures designed to address unemployment in 1977, including an extension of the Comprehensive Employment and Training Act, but he continued to focus primarily on reducing deficits and inflation. In November 1978, Carter signed the Revenue Act of 1978, a $19 billion tax cut.

Federal budget deficits throughout Carter's term remained at around the $70 billion level reached in 1976, but as a percentage of GDP the deficits fell from 4% when he took office to 2.5% in the 1980–81 fiscal year. The national debt of the United States increased by about $280 billion, from $620 billion in early 1977 to $900 billion in late 1980. However, because economic growth outpaced the growth in nominal debt, the federal government's debt as a percentage of gross domestic product decreased slightly, from 33.6% in early 1977 to 31.8% in late 1980.

=== Energy ===
==== National Energy Act ====
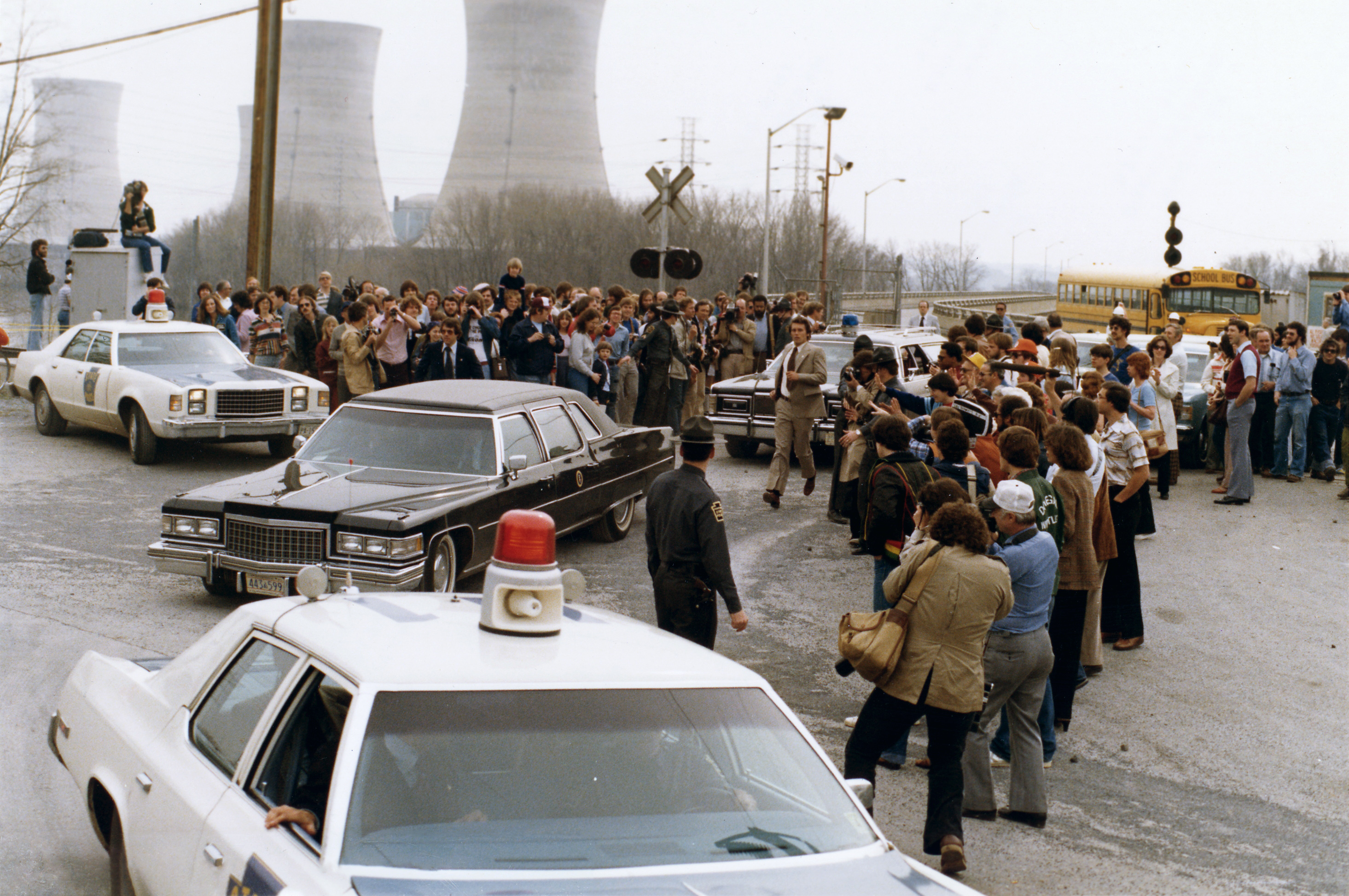
Carter at Three Mile Island nuclear accident, April 1979

In 1973, the Organization of Petroleum Exporting Countries (OPEC), based in the Middle East, had reduced output to raise world prices and to hurt Israel and its allies, including the United States. This sparked the 1973 Oil Crisis, a period of high oil prices, which in turn forced higher prices throughout the American economy and slowed economic growth. The United States continued to face energy issues in the following years, and during the winter of 1976–1977 natural gas shortages forced the closure of many schools and factories, leading to the temporary layoffs of hundreds of thousands of workers. By 1977, energy policy was one of the greatest challenges facing the United States. Oil imports had increased 65% annually since 1973, and the U.S. consumed over twice as much energy, per capita, as other developed countries.

Upon taking office, Carter asked James Schlesinger to develop a plan to address the energy crisis. In an address to the nation of April 18, 1977, Carter called the energy crisis as, apart from preventing war, "the greatest challenge that our country will face during our lifetime." He called for energy conservation, increased use of U.S. coal reserves, and carefully controlled expansion of nuclear power. His chief goals were to limit the growth of energy demand to an increase of two percent a year, cut oil imports in half, and establish a new strategic petroleum reserve containing a six-month supply. Carter won congressional approval for the creation of the Department of Energy, and he named Schlesinger as the first head of that department. Schlesinger presented an energy plan that contained 113 provisions, the most important of which were taxes on domestic oil production and gasoline consumption. The plan also provided for tax credits for energy conservation, taxes on automobiles with low fuel efficiency, and mandates to convert from oil or natural gas to coal power. The House approved much of Carter's plan in August 1977, but the Senate passed a series of watered-down energy bills that included few of Carter's proposals. Negotiations with Congress dragged on into 1978, but Carter signed the National Energy Act in November 1978. Many of Carter's original proposals were not included in the legislation, but the act deregulated natural gas and encouraged energy conservation and the development of renewable energy through tax credits.

==== 1979 energy crisis ====
Another energy shortage hit the United States in 1979, forcing millions of frustrated motorists into long waits at gasoline stations. In response, Carter asked Congress to deregulate the price of domestic oil. At the time, domestic oil prices were not set by the world market, but rather by the complex price controls of the 1975 Energy Policy and Conservation Act (EPCA). Oil companies strongly favored the deregulation of prices, since it would increase their profits, but some members of Congress worried that deregulation would contribute to inflation. In late April and early May the Gallup poll found only 14 percent of the public believed that America was in an actual energy shortage. The other 77 percent believed that this was brought on by oil companies just to make a profit. Carter paired the deregulation proposal with a windfall profits tax, which would return about half of the new profits of the oil companies to the federal government. Carter used a provision of EPCA to phase in oil controls, but Congress balked at implementing the proposed tax.

I want to talk to you right now about a fundamental threat to American democracy... I do not refer to the outward strength of America, a nation that is at peace tonight everywhere in the world, with unmatched economic power and military might. The threat is nearly invisible in ordinary ways. It is a crisis of confidence. It is a crisis that strikes at the very heart and soul and spirit of our national will. We can see this crisis in the growing doubt about the meaning of our own lives and in the loss of a unity of purpose for our nation...

— Jimmy Carter

In July 1979, as the energy crisis continued, Carter met with a series of business, government, labor, academic, and religious leaders in an effort to overhaul his administration's policies. His pollster, Pat Caddell, told him that the American people faced a crisis of confidence stemming from the assassinations of major leaders in the 1960s, the Vietnam War, and the Watergate scandal. Though most of his other top advisers urged him to continue to focus on inflation and the energy crisis, Carter seized on Caddell's notion that the major crisis facing the country was a crisis of confidence. On July 15, Carter delivered a nationally televised speech in which he called for long-term limits on oil imports and the development of synthetic fuels. But he also stated, "all the legislation in the world can't fix what's wrong with America. What is lacking is confidence and a sense of community." The speech, named A Crisis of Confidence, came to be known as his "malaise" speech, although Carter never used the word in the speech.

The initial reaction to Carter's speech was generally positive, but Carter erred by forcing out several cabinet members, including Secretary of Energy Schlesinger, later in July. Nonetheless, Congress approved a $227 billion windfall profits tax and passed the Energy Security Act. The Energy Security Act established the Synthetic Fuels Corporation, which was charged with developing alternative energy sources. Despite those legislative victories, in 1980 Congress rescinded Carter's imposition of a surcharge on imported oil, (Note: Congress rescinded the surcharge by passing a joint resolution over Carter's veto. Carter was the first president since Harry S. Truman to have his veto overridden by a Congress controlled by the same party.) and rejected his proposed Energy Mobilization Board, a government body that was designed to facilitate the construction of power plants. Nonetheless, Kaufman and Kaufman write that policies enacted under Carter represented the "most sweeping energy legislation in the nation's history." Carter's policies contributed to a decrease in per capita energy consumption, which dropped by 10 percent from 1979 to 1983. Oil imports, which had reached a record 2.4 billion barrels in 1977 (50% of supply), declined by half from 1979 to 1983.

=== Economy ===
Federal finances and GDP during Carter's presidency
Fiscal Year	Receipts	Outlays	Surplus/ Deficit	GDP	Debt as a % of GDP
1977	355.6	409.2	−53.7	2,024.3	27.1
1978	399.6	458.7	−59.2	2,273.5	26.7
1979	463.3	504.0	−40.7	2,565.6	25.0
1980	517.1	590.9	−73.8	2,791.9	25.5
1981	599.3	678.2	−79.0	3,133.2	25.2
Ref.					

Carter took office during a period of "stagflation", as the economy experienced both high inflation and low economic growth. The U.S. had recovered from the 1973–75 recession, but the economy, and especially inflation, continued to be a top concern for many Americans in 1977 and 1978. The economy had grown by 5% in 1976, and it continued to grow at a similar pace during 1977 and 1978. Unemployment declined from 7.5% in January 1977 to 5.6% by May 1979, with over 9 million net new jobs created during that interim, and real median household income grew by 5% from 1976 to 1978. In October 1978, responding to worsening inflation, Carter announced the beginning of "phase two" of his anti-inflation campaign on national television. He appointed Alfred E. Kahn as the Chairman of the Council on Wage and Price Stability (COWPS), and COWPS announced price targets for industries and implemented other policies designed to lower inflation.

The 1979 energy crisis ended a period of growth; both inflation and interest rates rose, while economic growth, job creation, and consumer confidence declined sharply. The relatively loose monetary policy adopted by Federal Reserve Board Chairman G. William Miller, had already contributed to somewhat higher inflation, rising from 5.8% in 1976 to 7.7% in 1978. The sudden doubling of crude oil prices by OPEC forced inflation to double-digit levels, averaging 11.3% in 1979 and 13.5% in 1980.

Following a mid-1979 cabinet shake-up, Carter named Paul Volcker as Chairman of the Federal Reserve Board. Volcker pursued a tight monetary policy to bring down inflation, but this policy also had the effect of slowing economic growth even further. Author Ivan Eland points out that this came during a long trend of inflation, saying, "Easy money and cheap credit during the 1970s, had caused rampant inflation, which reached 13 percent in 1979." Carter enacted an austerity program by executive order, justifying these measures by observing that inflation had reached a "crisis stage"; both inflation and short-term interest rates reached 18 percent in February and March 1980. In March, the Dow Jones Industrial Average fell to its lowest level since mid-1976, and the following month unemployment rose to seven percent. The economy entered into another recession, its fourth in little more than a decade, and unemployment quickly rose to 7.8 percent. This "V-shaped recession" and the malaise accompanying it coincided with Carter's 1980 re-election campaign, and contributed to his unexpectedly severe loss to Ronald Reagan. Not until March 1981 did GDP and employment totals regain pre-recession levels.

=== Health care ===
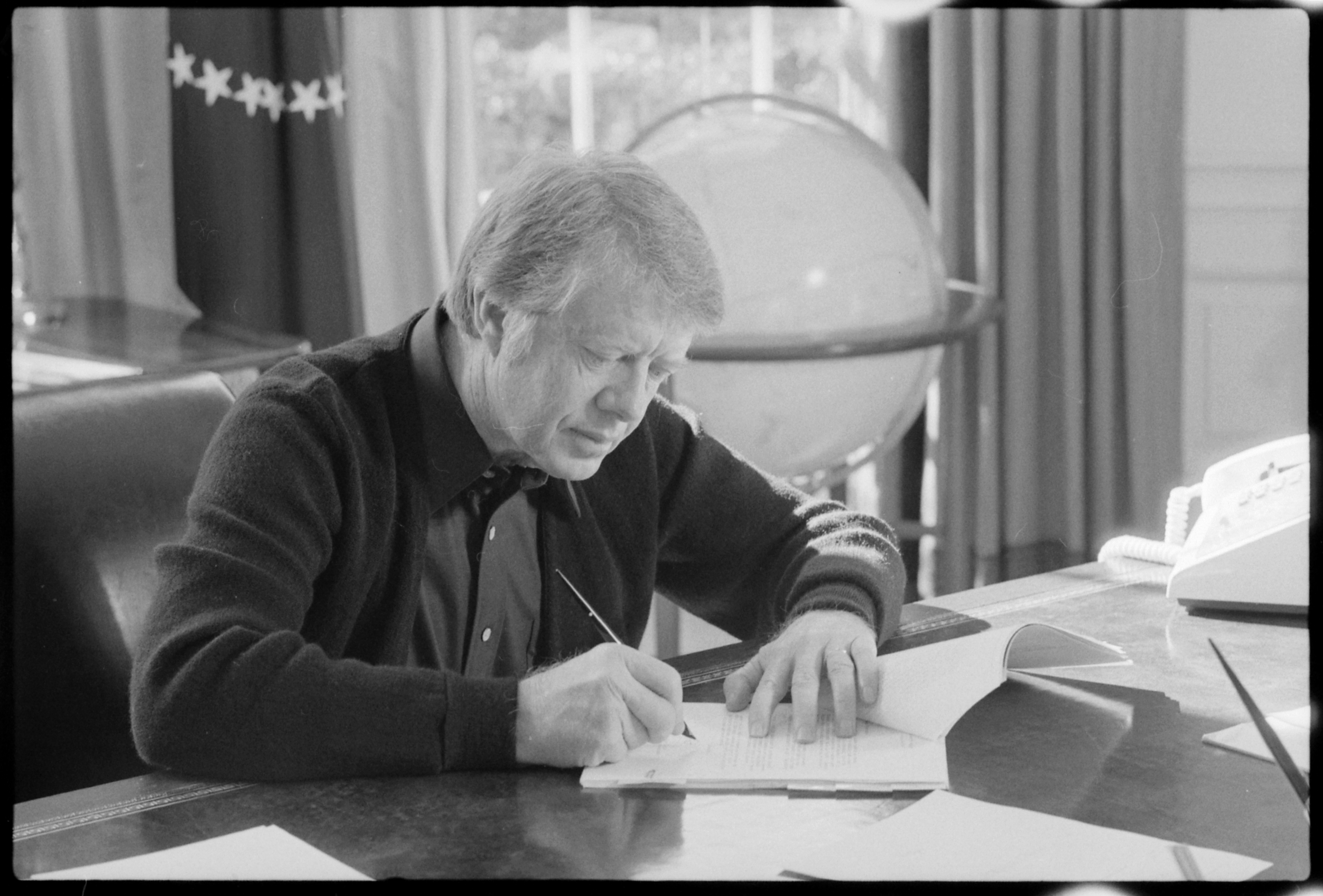
Carter in the Oval Office, February 1977

During the 1976 presidential campaign, Carter proposed a health care reform plan that included key features of a bipartisan bill, sponsored by Senator Ted Kennedy, that provided for the establishment of a universal national health insurance (NHI) system. Though most Americans had health insurance through Medicare, Medicaid, or private plans, approximately ten percent of the population did not have coverage in 1977. The establishment of an NHI plan was the top priority of organized labor and many liberal Democrats, but Carter had concerns about cost, as well as the inflationary impact, of such a system. He delayed consideration of health care through 1977, and ultimately decided that he would not support Kennedy's proposal to establish an NHI system that covered all Americans. Kennedy met repeatedly with Carter and White House staffers in an attempt to forge a compromise health care plan, but negotiations broke down in July 1978. Though Kennedy and Carter had previously been on good terms, differences over health insurance led to an open break between the two Democratic leaders.

In June 1979, Carter proposed more limited health insurance reform—an employer mandate to provide private catastrophic health insurance. The plan would also extend Medicaid to the very poor without dependent minor children, and would add catastrophic coverage to Medicare. Kennedy rejected the plan as insufficient. In November 1979, Senator Russell B. Long led a bipartisan conservative majority of the Senate Finance Committee to support an employer mandate to provide catastrophic coverage and the addition of catastrophic coverage to Medicare. These efforts were abandoned in 1980 due to budget constraints.

=== Welfare and tax reform proposals ===
Carter sought a comprehensive overhaul of welfare programs in order to provide more cost-effective aid; Congress rejected almost all of his proposals. Proposals contemplated by the Carter administration include a guaranteed minimum income, a federal job guarantee for the unemployed, a negative income tax, and direct cash payments to aid recipients. In early 1977, Secretary Califano presented Carter with several options for welfare reform, all of which Carter rejected because they increased government spending. In August 1977, Carter proposed a major jobs program for welfare recipients capable of working and a "decent income" to those who were incapable of working. Carter was unable to win support for his welfare reform proposals, and they never received a vote in Congress. In October 1978, Carter helped convince the Senate to pass the Humphrey–Hawkins Full Employment Act, which committed the federal government to the goals of low inflation and low unemployment. To the disappointment of the Congressional Black Caucus (CBC) and organized labor, the final act did not include a provision authorizing the federal government to act as an employer of last resort in order to provide for full employment.

Carter also sought tax reform in order to create a simpler, more progressive taxation system. He proposed taxing capital gains as ordinary income, eliminating tax shelters, limiting itemized tax deductions, and increasing the standard deduction. Carter's taxation proposals were rejected by Congress, and no major tax reform bill was passed during Carter's presidency. Amid growing public fear that the social security system was in danger of bankruptcy within a few years, Carter signed the Social Security Financing Amendments Act in December 1977, which corrected a flaw that had been introduced into the benefit formula by earlier legislation in 1972, raised Social Security taxes and reduced Social Security benefits. "Now this legislation", the president remarked, "will guarantee that from 1980 to the year 2030, the social security funds will be sound".

=== Environment ===
Carter supported many of the goals of the environmentalist movement, and appointed prominent environmentalists to high positions. As president his rhetoric strongly supported environmentalism, with a certain softness regarding his acceptance of nuclear energy – he had been trained in nuclear energy with atomic submarines in the Navy. He signed several significant bills to protect the environment, such as the Surface Mining Control and Reclamation Act of 1977, which regulates strip mining. Other environmental laws signed by Carter addressed energy conservation, federal mine safety standards, and control of pesticides. Secretary of the Interior Cecil Andrus convinced Carter to withdraw over 100 million acres of public domain land in Alaska from commercial use by designating the land as conservation areas. The 1980 Alaska National Interest Lands Conservation Act doubled the amount of public land set aside for national parks and wildlife refuges. Business and conservative interests complained that economic growth would be hurt by these conservation efforts.

==== EPA Love Canal Superfund ====
In 1978, Carter declared a federal emergency in the neighborhood of Love Canal in the city of Niagara Falls, New York. More than 800 families were evacuated from the neighborhood, which had been built on top of a toxic waste landfill. Federal disaster money was appropriated to demolish the approximately 500 houses, the 99th Street School, and the 93rd Street School, which had been built on top of the dump; and to remediate the dump and construct a containment area for the hazardous wastes. This was the first time that such a process had been undertaken. Carter acknowledged that several more "Love Canals" existed across the country, and that discovering such hazardous dumpsites was "one of the grimmest discoveries of our modern era". In 1980, Carter signed into law a bill that established Superfund, a federal program designed to clean up mining or factory sites contaminated with hazardous substances.

=== Education ===
Early in his term, Carter worked to fulfill a campaign promise to teachers' unions to create a cabinet-level Department of Education. Carter argued that the establishment of the department would increase efficiency and equal opportunity, but opponents in both parties criticized it as an additional layer of bureaucracy that would reduce local control and local support of education. In October 1979, Carter signed the Department of Education Organization Act, establishing the United States Department of Education. Carter appointed Shirley Mount Hufstedler, a liberal judge from California, as the first Secretary of Education. Carter also expanded the Head Start program with the addition of 43,000 children and families. During his tenure, education spending as a share of federal, non-defense spending was doubled. Carter opposed tax breaks for Protestant schools in the South, a position that alienated some on the Religious Right. He also helped defeat the Moynihan-Packwood Bill, which called for tuition tax credits for parents to use for nonpublic school education.

=== Other initiatives ===
Carter took a stance in support of decriminalization of cannabis, citing the legislation passed in Oregon in 1973. In a 1977 address to Congress, Carter submitted that penalties for cannabis use should not outweigh the actual harms of cannabis consumption. Carter retained pro-decriminalization advisor Robert DuPont, and appointed pro-decriminalization British physician Peter Bourne as his drug advisor (or "drug czar") to head up his newly formed Office of Drug Abuse Policy. However, law enforcement, conservative politicians, and grassroots parents' groups opposed this measure, and the war on drugs continued. At the same time, cannabis consumption in the United States reached historically high levels.

Carter was the first president to address the topic of gay rights, and his administration was the first to meet with a group of gay rights activists. Carter opposed the Briggs Initiative, a California ballot measure that would have banned gays and supporters of gay rights from being public school teachers. Carter supported the policy of affirmative action, and his administration submitted an amicus curiae brief to the Supreme Court while it heard the case of Regents of the University of California v. Bakke. The Supreme Court's holding, delivered in 1978, upheld the constitutionality of affirmative action but vetoed the use of racial quotas in college admissions. First Lady Rosalynn Carter publicly campaigned for the ratification of the Equal Rights Amendment, and the president supported the extension of the ratification period for that amendment.

Carter presided over the deregulation of several industries, which proponents hoped would help revive the sluggish economy. The Airline Deregulation Act (1978) abolished the Civil Aeronautics Board over six years, provided for the free entry of airlines into new routes, and opened air fares up to competition. Carter also signed the Motor Carrier Act (1980), which gradually withdrew the government from controlling access, rates, and routes in the trucking industry; the Staggers Rail Act (1980), which loosened railroad regulations by allowing railroad executives to negotiate mergers with barge and truck lines; and the Depository Institutions Deregulation and Monetary Control Act (1980), which removed ceilings on interest rates and permitted savings and commercial banks to write home mortgages, extend business loans, and underwrite securities issues.

The Housing and Community Development Act of 1977 set up Urban Development Action Grants, extended handicapped and elderly provisions, and established the Community Reinvestment Act, which sought to prevent banks from denying credit and loans to poor communities. The Child Nutrition Amendments of 1978 introduced a national income standard for program eligibility based on income standards prescribed for reduced-price school lunches. The Act also strengthened the nutrition education component of the WIC program by requiring the provision of nutritional education to all program participants. Urban development Action grants supplied nearly $5 million for some 3,300 projects in declining cities, and a Fair Debt Collection Practices Act was passed with the aim of prohibiting "abusive and unfair techniques of debt collection." The Surface Mining Control and Reclamation Act of 1977 was passed with the intention of enabling the coal industry to develop coal resources without damaging other natural resources in the process, while the Federal Mine Safety and Health Act of 1977 was aimed at safeguarding mineworkers from harm in the workplace. Occupational Safety and Health Administration (OSHA) programs and women's programs were also strengthened, and "common sense priorities" led to focus on major health problems. The Pregnancy Discrimination Act, passed in 1978, prohibited companies or organizations from discriminating against pregnant employees while providing protection in the areas of childbirth and medical conditions related to pregnancy or childbirth. The National Consumer Cooperative Bank Act of 1978 sought to put funds aside for low-interest loans to start cooperatives. Minimum wage coverage was extended to farmworkers, and the Age Discrimination in Employment Act Amendments of 1978 increased the upper age limit on coverage against age discrimination in non-federal employment and in the private sector from 65 to 70 as a means of extending safeguards against age discrimination. In addition, the purchase requirement for food stamps was abolished and the first-ever national youth employment law was enacted.

In 1979 Carter opened the first White House Conference on Library and Information Services stating that "libraries must be strengthened and the public made more aware of their potential: Libraries can be community resources for the consumer and small business on matters such as energy and marketing and technological innovation." The White House Conference on Library and Information Services was a project of the National Commission on Libraries and Information Science.

In 1980, Carter signed the Chrysler Corporation Loan Guarantee Act of 1979, which bailed out the Chrysler Corporation—one of the "Big Three" automobile manufacturers in the U.S.—with $3.5 billion (equivalent to $11.5 billion in 2025) in aid. The bill turned over $162 million in stock to Chrysler's workers, eliminated around $125 million in wage increases, and gave Chrysler $500 million in bank loans. Chrysler had been facing almost certain bankruptcy after losing around $1 billion before Congress intervened.

== Foreign affairs ==
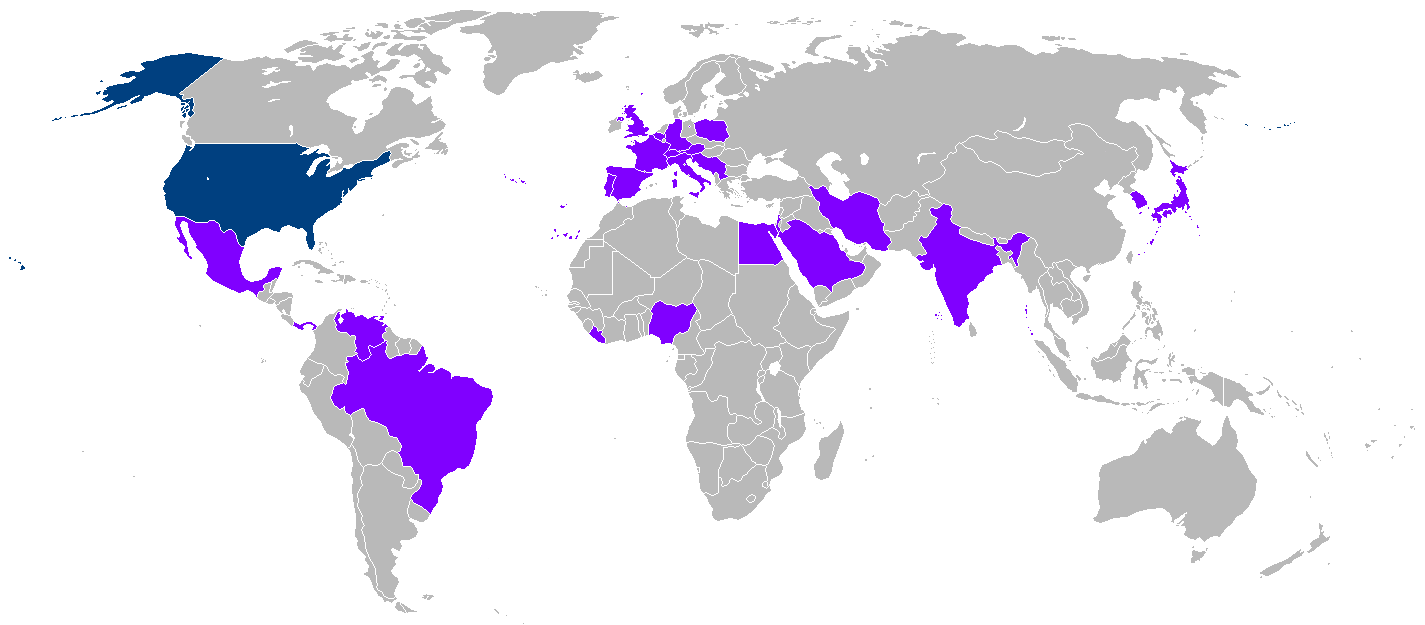
Carter made 12 international trips to 25 different countries during his presidency.

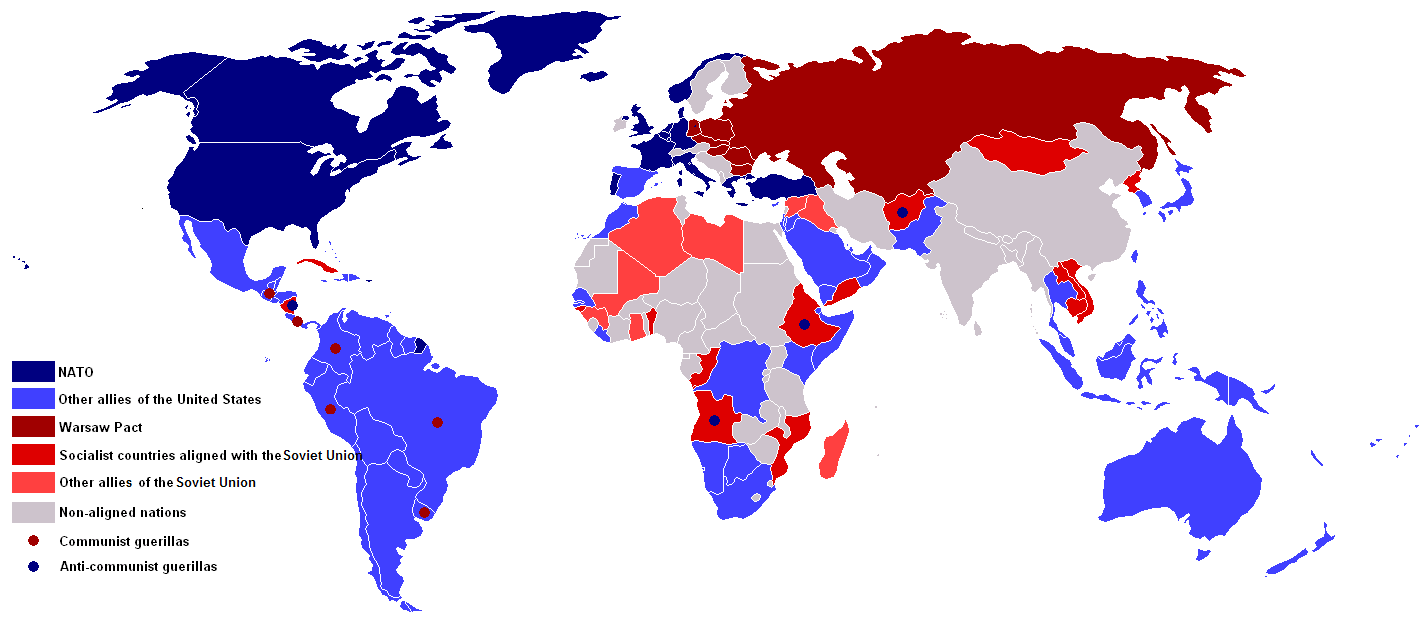
A map of the geopolitical situation in 1980

Although foreign policy was not his highest priority at first, a series of worsening crises made it increasingly the focus of attention regarding the Soviet Union, Afghanistan, Iran, and the global energy crisis. His handling of the Iranian Revolution and hostage crisis made him very unpopular at home and lowered his historical stature as measured by historians.

=== Cold War ===
Carter took office during the Cold War, a sustained period of geopolitical tension between the United States and the Soviet Union. During the late 1960s and early 1970s, relations between the two superpowers had improved through a policy known as detente. In a reflection of the waning importance of the Cold War, some of Carter's contemporaries labeled him as the first post-Cold War president, but relations with the Soviet Union would continue to be an important factor in American foreign policy in the late 1970s and the 1980s. Many of the leading officials in the Carter administration, including Carter himself, were members of the Trilateral Commission, which de-emphasized the Cold War. The Trilateral Commission instead advocated a foreign policy focused on aid to Third World countries and improved relations with Western Europe and Japan. The central tension of the Carter administration's foreign policy was reflected in the division between Secretary of State Cyrus Vance, who sought improved relations with the Soviet Union and the Third World, and National Security Adviser Zbigniew Brzezinski, who favored confrontation with the Soviet Union on a range of issues. After the disappointment of the Vietnam War a re-focus of the US Army on the Warsaw Pact problem found that technology and teamwork both were in dire need to be upgraded. Guided by General Donn A. Starry and the concept that was to become AirLand Battle, Carter and his administration approved the initial outlays for the A-10, AH-64, HIMARS, Bradley IFV, M109 Paladin, Patriot missile, M1 Abrams, and the Lockheed F-117 Nighthawk.

==== Human rights ====
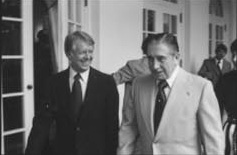
Carter meeting with Chilean dictator Augusto Pinochet, in Washington, September 6, 1977

Carter believed that previous administrations had erred in allowing the Cold War concerns and Realpolitik to dominate foreign policy. His administration placed a new emphasis on human rights, democratic values, nuclear proliferation, and global poverty. The Carter administration's human rights emphasis was part of a broader, worldwide focus on human rights in the 1970s, as non-governmental organizations such as Amnesty International and Human Rights Watch became increasingly prominent. Carter nominated civil rights activist Patricia M. Derian as Coordinator for Human Rights and Humanitarian Affairs, and in August 1977, had the post elevated to that of Assistant Secretary of State. Derian established the United States' Country Reports on Human Rights Practices, published annually since 1977.

Latin America was central to Carter's new focus on human rights. The Carter administration ended support to the historically U.S.-backed Somoza regime in Nicaragua and directed aid to the new Sandinista National Liberation Front government that assumed power after Somoza's overthrow. Carter also cut back or terminated military aid to Augusto Pinochet of Chile, Ernesto Geisel of Brazil, and Jorge Rafael Videla of Argentina, all of whom he criticized for human rights violations.

Carter's ambassador to the United Nations, Andrew Young, was the first African American to hold a high-level diplomatic post. Along with Carter, he sought to change U.S. policy towards Africa, emphasizing human rights concerns over Cold War issues. In 1978, Carter became the first sitting president to make an official state visit to sub-Saharan Africa, a reflection of the region's new importance under the Carter administration's foreign policy. Unlike his predecessors, Carter took a strong stance against white minority rule in Rhodesia and South Africa. With Carter's support, the United Nations passed Resolution 418, which placed an arms embargo on South Africa. Carter won the repeal of the Byrd Amendment, which had undercut international sanctions on the Rhodesian government of Ian Smith. He also pressured Smith to hold elections, leading to the 1979 Rhodesia elections and the eventual creation of Zimbabwe.

The more assertive human rights policy championed by Derian and State Department Policy Planning Director Anthony Lake was somewhat blunted by the opposition of Brzezinski. Policy disputes reached their most contentious point during the 1979 fall of Pol Pot's genocidal regime of Democratic Kampuchea following the Vietnamese invasion of Cambodia, when Brzezinski prevailed in having the administration refuse to recognize the new Cambodian government due to its support by the Soviet Union. Despite human rights concerns, Carter continued U.S. support for Joseph Mobutu of Zaire, who defeated Angolan-backed insurgents in conflicts known as Shaba I and Shaba II. His administration also generally refrained from criticizing human rights abuses in the Philippines, Indonesia, South Korea, Iran, Israel, Egypt, Saudi Arabia, and North Yemen.

==== SALT II ====
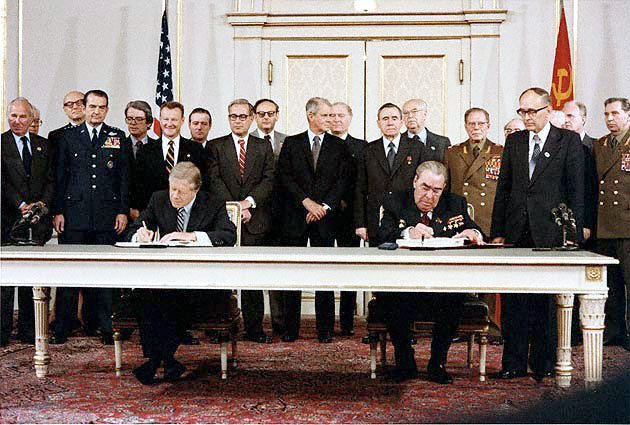
President Jimmy Carter and Soviet general secretary Leonid Brezhnev sign the Strategic Arms Limitation Talks (SALT II) treaty, June 18, 1979, in Vienna

Ford and Nixon had sought to reach agreement on a second round of the Strategic Arms Limitation Talks (SALT), which had set upper limits on the number of nuclear weapons possessed by both the United States and the Soviet Union. Carter hoped to extend these talks by reaching an agreement to reduce, rather than merely set upper limits on, the nuclear arsenals of both countries. At the same time, he criticized the Soviet Union's record with regard to human rights, partly because he believed the public would not support negotiations with the Soviets if the president seemed too willing to accommodate the Soviets. Carter and Soviet Leader Leonid Brezhnev reached an agreement in June 1979 in the form of SALT II, but Carter's waning popularity and the opposition of Republicans and neoconservative Democrats made ratification difficult. The Soviet invasion of Afghanistan severely damaged U.S.-Soviet relations and ended any hope of ratifying SALT II.

==== Yemen ====
In 1979, the Soviets intervened in the Second Yemenite War. The Soviet backing of South Yemen constituted a "smaller shock", in tandem with the Iranian Revolution. This played a role in shifting Carter's viewpoint on the Soviet Union to a more assertive one, a shift that finalized with the Soviet-Afghan War.

==== Afghanistan ====
Afghanistan had been non-aligned during the early stages of the Cold War. In 1978, Communists under the leadership of Nur Muhammad Taraki seized power. The new regime—which was divided between Taraki's extremist Khalq faction and the more moderate Parcham—signed a treaty of friendship with the Soviet Union in December 1978. Taraki's efforts to improve secular education and redistribute land were accompanied by mass executions and political oppression unprecedented in Afghan history, igniting a revolt by Afghan mujahideen rebels. Following a general uprising in April 1979, Taraki was deposed by Khalq rival Hafizullah Amin in September. Soviet leaders feared that an Islamist government in Afghanistan would threaten the control of Soviet Central Asia, and, as the unrest continued, they deployed 30,000 soldiers to the Soviet–Afghan border. Historian George C. Herring states Carter and Brzezinski both saw Afghanistan as a potential "trap" that could expend Soviet resources in a fruitless war, and the U.S. began sending aid to the mujahideen rebels in mid-1979. However, a 2020 review of declassified U.S. documents by Conor Tobin in the journal Diplomatic History found that "a Soviet military intervention was neither sought nor desired by the Carter administration ... The small-scale covert program that developed in response to the increasing Soviet influence was part of a contingency plan if the Soviets did intervene militarily, as Washington would be in a better position to make it difficult for them to consolidate their position, but not designed to induce an intervention." By December, Amin's government had lost control of much of the country, prompting the Soviet Union to invade Afghanistan, execute Amin, and install Parcham leader Babrak Karmal as president.

Carter was surprised by the Soviet invasion of Afghanistan, as the consensus of the U.S. intelligence community during 1978 and 1979 was that Moscow would not forcefully intervene. CIA officials had tracked the deployment of Soviet soldiers to the Afghan border, but they had not expected the Soviets to launch a full-fledged invasion. Carter believed that the Soviet conquest of Afghanistan would present a grave threat to the Persian Gulf region, and he vigorously responded to what he considered a dangerous provocation. In a televised speech, Carter announced sanctions on the Soviet Union, promised renewed aid to Pakistan, and articulated the Carter doctrine, which stated that the U.S. would repel any attempt to gain control of the Persian Gulf. Pakistani leader Muhammad Zia-ul-Haq had previously had poor relations with Carter due to Pakistan's nuclear program and the execution of Zulfikar Ali Bhutto, but the Soviet invasion of Afghanistan and instability in Iran reinvigorated the traditional Pakistan–United States alliance. In cooperation with Saudi Arabia and Pakistan's Inter-Services Intelligence (ISI), Carter increased aid to the mujahideen through the CIA's Operation Cyclone. Carter also later announced a U.S. boycott of the 1980 Summer Olympics in Moscow, which was joined by 65 other nations, and imposed an embargo on shipping American wheat to the Soviet Union. The embargo ultimately hurt American farmers more than it did the Soviet economy, and the United States lifted the embargo after Carter left office.

The Soviet invasion of Afghanistan brought a significant change in Carter's foreign policy and ended the period of detente that had begun in the mid-1960s. Returning to a policy of containment, the United States reconciled with Cold War allies and increased the defense budget, leading to a new arms race with the Soviet Union. U.S. support for the mujahideen in Afghanistan would continue until the Soviet Union withdrew from Afghanistan in 1989. The USSR collapsed two years later.

=== Middle East ===
==== Camp David Accords ====
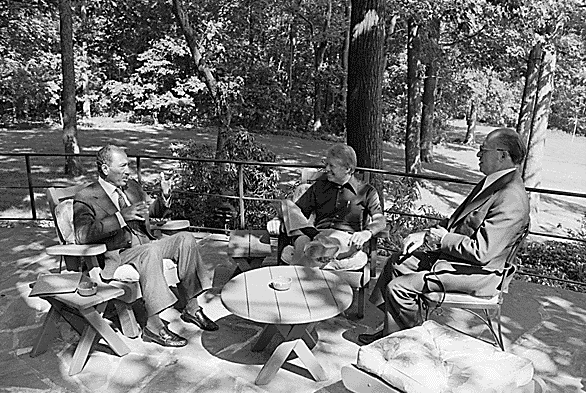
Anwar Sadat, Jimmy Carter and Menachem Begin meet at Camp David on September 6, 1978.

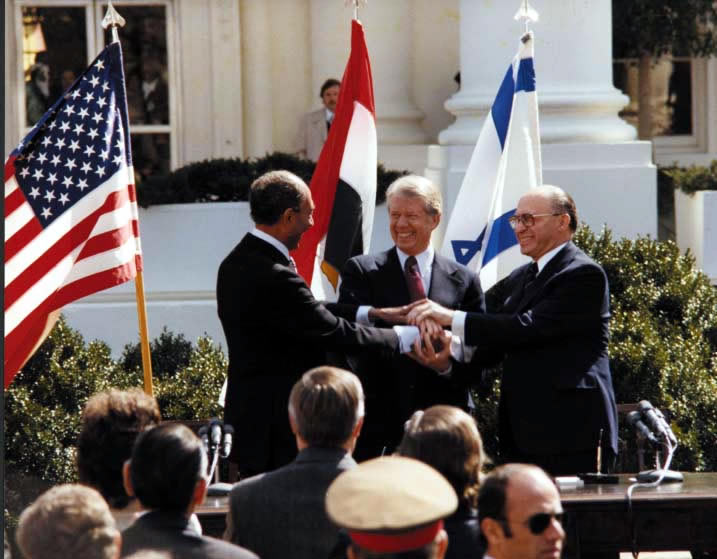
Sadat, Carter and Begin shaking hands after signing Peace treaty between Egypt and Israel in the White House, March 27, 1979

On taking office, Carter decided to attempt to mediate the long-running Arab–Israeli conflict. He sought a comprehensive settlement between Israel and its neighbors through a reconvening of the 1973 Geneva Conference, but these efforts had collapsed by the end of 1977. Carter did convince Egyptian leader Anwar Sadat to visit Israel in 1978. Sadat's visit drew the condemnation of other Arab League countries, but Sadat and Israeli Prime Minister Menachem Begin each expressed an openness to bilateral talks. Begin sought security guarantees; Sadat sought the withdrawal of Israeli forces from the Sinai Peninsula and home rule for the West Bank and Gaza, Israeli-occupied territories that were largely populated by Palestinian Arabs. Israel had taken control of the West Bank and Gaza in the 1967 Six-Day War, while the Sinai had been occupied by Israel since the end of the 1973 Yom Kippur War.

Seeking to further negotiations, Carter invited Begin and Sadat to the presidential retreat of Camp David in September 1978. Because direct negotiations between Sadat and Begin proved unproductive, Carter began meeting with the two leaders individually. While Begin was willing to withdraw from the Sinai Peninsula, he refused to agree to the establishment of a Palestinian state. Israel had begun constructing settlements in the West Bank, which emerged as an important barrier to a peace agreement. Unable to come to definitive settlement over an Israeli withdrawal, the two sides reached an agreement in which Israel promised to allow the creation of an elected government in the West Bank and Gaza. In return, Egypt became the first Arab state to recognize Israel's right to exist. The Camp David Accords were the subject of intense domestic opposition in both Egypt and Israel, as well as the wider Arab World, but each side agreed to negotiate a peace treaty on the basis of the accords.

On March 26, 1979, Egypt and Israel signed a peace treaty in Washington, Carter's role in getting the treaty was essential. Author Aaron David Miller concluded the following: "No matter whom I spoke to — Americans, Egyptians, or Israelis — most everyone said the same thing: no Carter, no peace treaty." Carter himself viewed the agreement as his most important accomplishment in office.

==== Iranian Revolution and hostage crisis ====
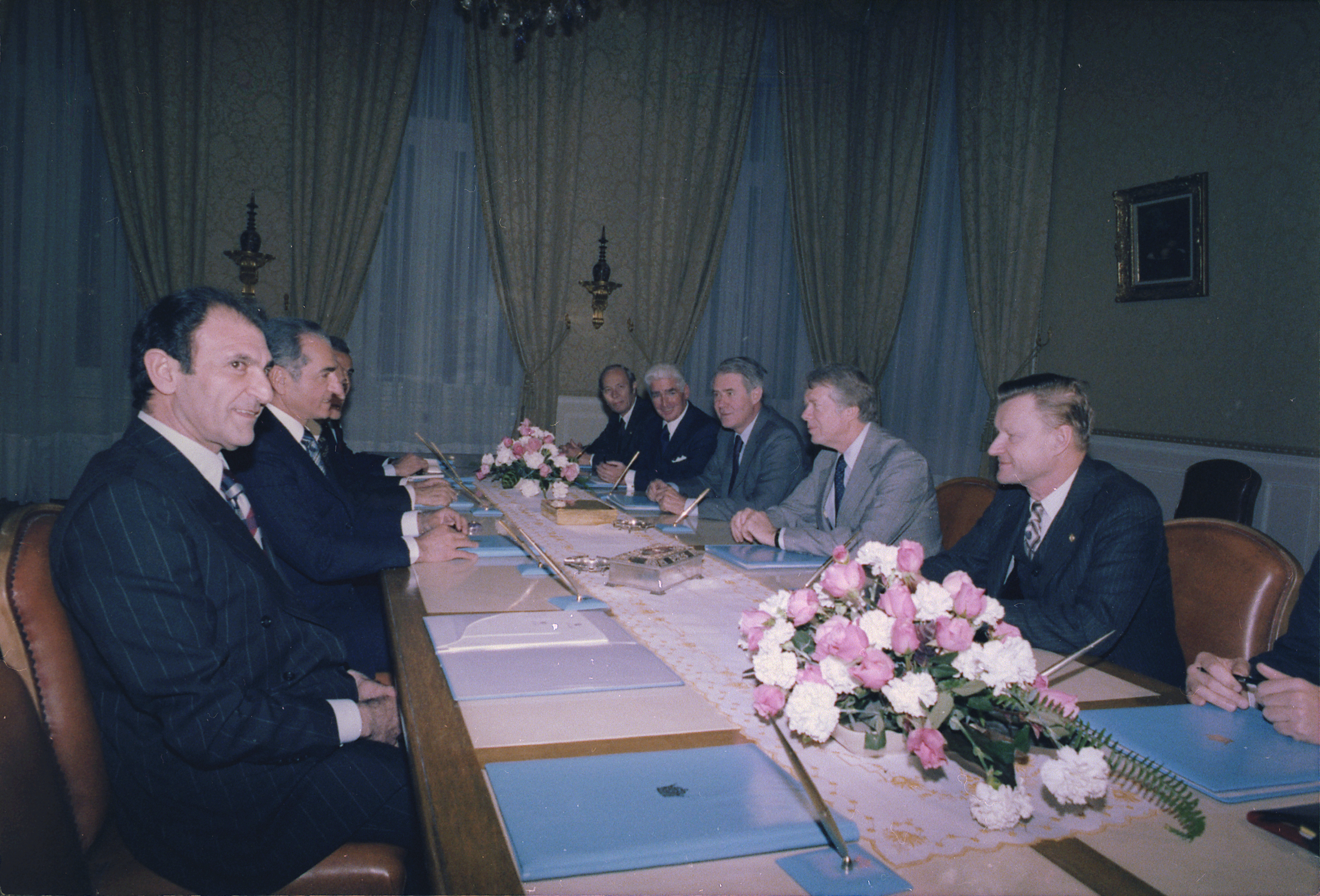
The Iranian Shah, Mohammad Reza Pahlavi, meeting with Alfred Atherton, William H. Sullivan, Cyrus Vance, President Jimmy Carter and Zbigniew Brzezinski in Tehran, 1977

Mohammad Reza Pahlavi, the Shah of Iran, had been a reliable U.S. ally since the 1953 Iranian coup d'état. During the years after the coup, the U.S. lavished aid on Iran, while Iran served as a dependable source of oil exports. Carter, Vance, and Brzezinski all viewed Iran as a key Cold War ally, not only for the oil it produced but also because of its influence in OPEC and its strategic position between the Soviet Union and the Persian Gulf. Despite human rights violations, Carter visited Iran in late 1977 and authorized the sale of U.S. fighter aircraft. That same year, rioting broke out in several cities, and it soon spread across the country. Poor economic conditions, the unpopularity of Pahlavi's "White Revolution", and an Islamic revival all led to increasing anger among Iranians, many of whom also despised the United States for its support of Pahlavi and its role in the 1953 coup.

By 1978, the Iranian Revolution had broken out against the Shah's rule. Secretary of State Vance argued that the Shah should institute a series of reforms to appease the voices of discontent, while Brzezinski argued in favor of a crackdown on dissent. The mixed messages that the Shah received from Vance and Brzezinski contributed to his confusion and indecision. The Shah went into exile, leaving a caretaker government in control. A popular religious figure, Ayatollah Ruhollah Khomeini, returned from exile in February 1979 to popular acclaim. As the unrest continued, Carter allowed Pahlavi into the United States for medical treatment. Carter and Vance were both initially reluctant to admit Pahlavi due to concerns about the reaction in Iran, but Iranian leaders assured them that it would not cause an issue. In November 1979, shortly after Pahlavi was allowed to enter the U.S., a group of Iranians stormed the U.S. embassy in Tehran and took 66 American captives, beginning the Iran hostage crisis. Iranian Prime Minister Mehdi Bazargan ordered the militants to release the hostages, but he resigned from office after Khomeini backed the militants.

The crisis quickly became the subject of international and domestic attention, and Carter vowed to secure the release of the hostages. He refused the Iranian demand of the return of Pahlavi in exchange for the release of the hostages. His approval ratings rose as Americans rallied around his response, but the crisis became increasingly problematic for his administration as it continued. In an attempt to rescue the hostages, Carter launched Operation Eagle Claw in April 1980. The operation was a total disaster, and it ended in the death of eight American soldiers. The failure of the operation strengthened Ayatollah Khomeini's position in Iran and badly damaged Carter's domestic standing. Carter was dealt another blow when Vance, who had consistently opposed the operation, resigned. Iran refused to negotiate the return of the hostages until Iraq launched an invasion in September 1980. With Algeria serving as an intermediary, negotiations continued until an agreement was reached in January 1981. In return for releasing the 52 captives, Iran was allowed access to over $7 billion of its money that had been frozen in the United States. Iran waited to release the captives until 30 minutes after Carter left office on January 20, 1981.

Released in 2017, a declassified memo produced by the CIA in 1980 concluded "Iranian hardliners – especially Ayatollah Khomeini" were "determined to exploit the hostage issue to bring about President Carter's defeat in the November elections." Additionally, Tehran in 1980 wanted "the world to believe that Imam Khomeini caused President Carter's downfall and disgrace."

=== Latin America ===
==== Panama Canal treaties ====
Statement on the Panama Canal Treaty Signing
Jimmy Carter's speech upon signing the Panama Canal treaty, September 7, 1977.

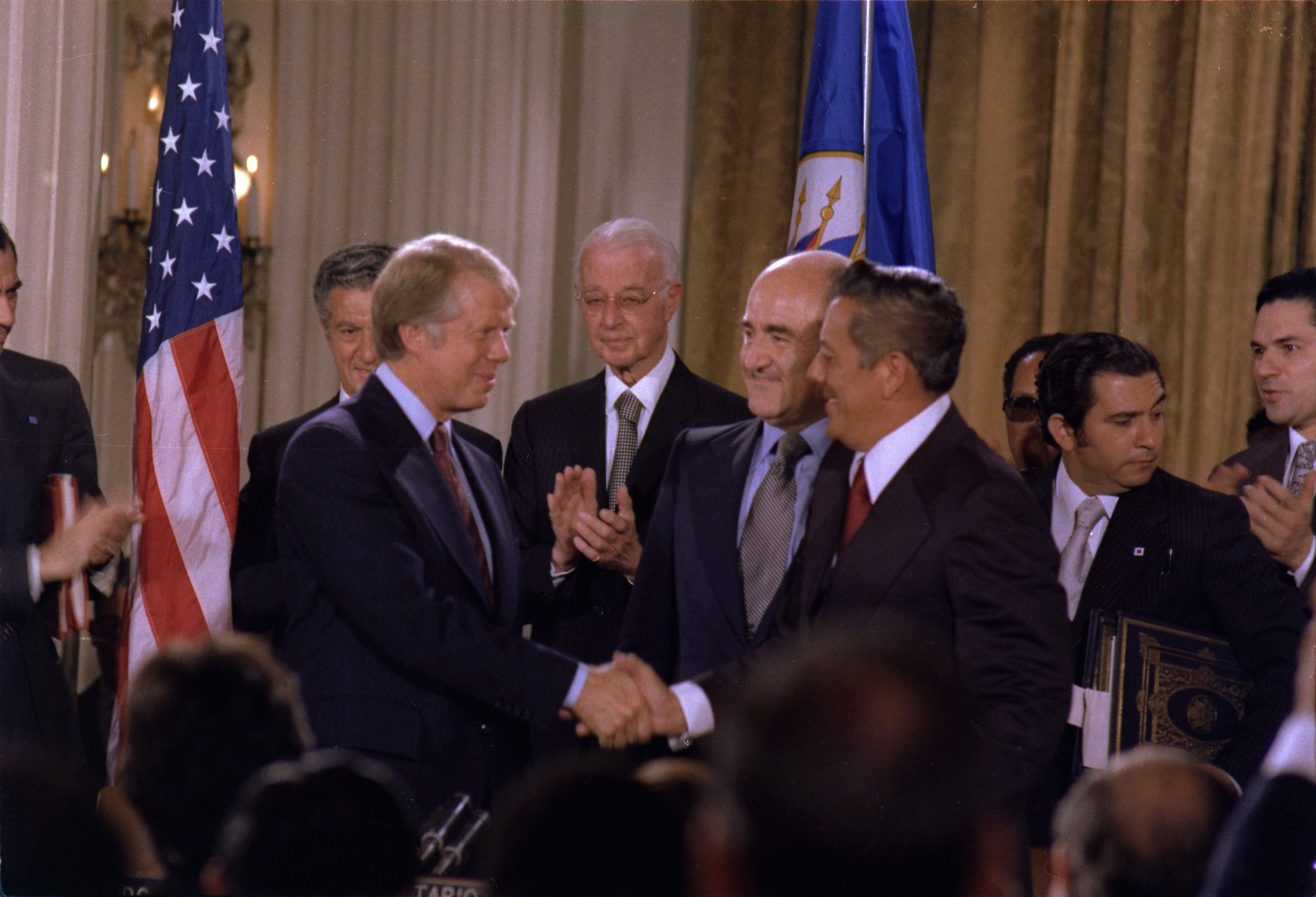
Carter and Omar Torrijos shake hands moments after the signing of the Torrijos-Carter Treaties.

Since the 1960s, Panama had called for the United States to cede control of the Panama Canal. The bipartisan national policy of turning over the Canal to Panama had been established by presidents Johnson, Nixon, and Ford, but negotiations had dragged on for a dozen years. Carter made the cession of the Panama Canal a priority, believing it would implement Carter's call for a moral cleaning of American foreign policy and win approval across Latin America as a gracious apology for American wrongdoing. He also feared that another postponement of negotiations might precipitate violent upheaval in Panama, which could damage or block the canal.

The Carter administration negotiated the Torrijos-Carter Treaties, two treaties which provided that Panama would gain control of the canal in 1999. Carter's initiative faced wide resistance in the United States, and many in the public, particularly conservatives, thought that Carter was "giving away" a crucial U.S. asset. Conservatives formed groups such as the Committee to Save the Panama Canal in an attempt to defeat the treaties in the Senate, but Carter made ratification of the treaties his top priority. During the ratification debate, the Senate crafted amendments that granted the U.S. the right to intervene militarily to keep the canal open, which the Panamanians assented to after further negotiations. In March 1978, the Senate ratified both treaties by a margin of 68-to-32, narrowly passing the two-thirds margin necessary for ratification. The Canal Zone and all its facilities were ultimately turned over to Panama on December 31, 1999.

==== Cuba ====
Carter hoped to improve relations with Cuba upon taking office, but any thaw in relations was prevented by ongoing Cold War disputes in Central America and Africa. In early 1980, Cuban leader Fidel Castro announced that anyone who wished to leave Cuba would be allowed to do so through the port of Mariel. After Carter announced that the United States would provide "open arms for the tens of thousands of refugees seeking freedom from Communist domination", Cuban Americans arranged the Mariel boatlift. The Refugee Act, signed earlier in the year, had provided for annual cap of 19,500 Cuban immigrants to the United States per year, and required that those refugees go through a review process. By September, 125,000 Cubans had arrived in the United States, and many faced a lack of adequate food and housing. Carter was widely criticized for his handling of the boatlift, especially in the electorally important state of Florida.

=== Asia ===
==== Rapprochement with China ====
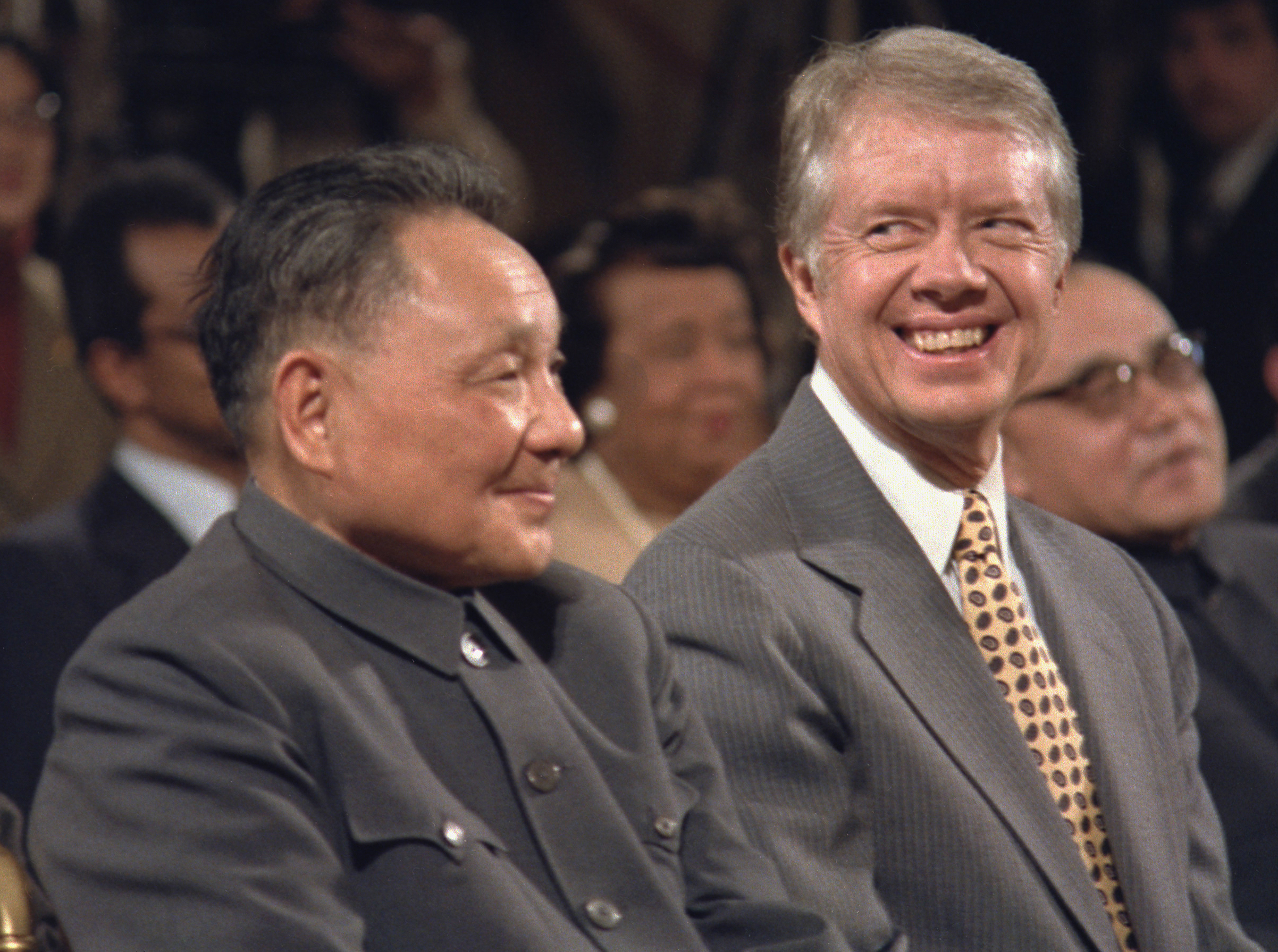
Deng Xiaoping with President Carter

Continuing a rapprochement begun during the Nixon administration, Carter successfully achieved closer relations with the People's Republic of China (PRC). The two countries increasingly collaborated against the Soviet Union, and the Carter administration tacitly consented to the Chinese invasion of Vietnam. In 1979, Carter extended formal diplomatic recognition to the PRC for the first time. This decision led to a boom in trade between the United States and the PRC, which was pursuing economic reforms under the leadership of Deng Xiaoping. After the Soviet invasion of Afghanistan, Carter allowed the sale of military supplies to China and began negotiations to share military intelligence. In January 1980, Carter unilaterally revoked the Sino-American Mutual Defense Treaty with the Republic of China (ROC), which had lost control of mainland China to the PRC in the Chinese Civil War, but was now based offshore on the island of Taiwan. Carter's abrogation of the treaty was challenged in court by conservative Republicans, but the Supreme Court ruled that the issue was a non-justiciable political question in Goldwater v. Carter. The U.S. continued to maintain diplomatic contacts with the ROC through the 1979 Taiwan Relations Act.

==== South Korea ====
One of Carter's first acts was to order the withdrawal of troops from South Korea, which had hosted a large number of U.S. military personnel since the end of the Korean War. Carter believed that the soldiers could be put to better use in Western Europe, but opponents of the withdrawal feared that North Korea would invade South Korea in the aftermath of the withdrawal. South Korea and Japan both protested the move, as did many members of Congress, the military, and the State Department. After a strong backlash, Carter delayed the withdrawal, and ultimately only a fraction of the U.S. forces left South Korea. Carter's attempt to remove U.S. forces from South Korea weakened the government of South Korean President Park Chung-hee, who was assassinated in 1979.

In May 1980, the Carter administration supported the violent suppression of the pro-democracy Gwangju Uprising by President Chun Doo-hwan. The Carter government was already aware that the South Korean military had killed 60 people when it approved the use of force. It also had contingency plans in place to deploy American troops to aid in the suppression of the democratic uprising.

=== Africa ===
In sharp contrast to Nixon and Ford, Carter gave priority to sub-Saharan Africa. Southern Africa especially emerged as a Cold War battleground after Cuba sent a large military force that took control of Angola in 1976. The chief policy person for Africa in the Carter administration was Andrew Young, a leader in the black Atlanta community who became Ambassador to the United Nations. Young opened up friendly relationships with key leaders, especially in Nigeria. A highly controversial issue was independence of Namibia from Union of South Africa. Young began United Nations discussions which went nowhere, and Namibia would not gain independence until long after Carter left office. Young advocated strong sanctions after the murder by South African police of Steve Biko in 1977, but Carter refused and only imposed a limited arms embargo and South Africa ignored the protests. The most important success of the Carter administration in Africa was helping the transition from white-dominated Southern Rhodesia to black rule in Zimbabwe.

== Controversies ==
OMB Director Bert Lance resigned his position on September 21, 1977, amid allegations of improper banking activities prior to his becoming director. The controversy over Lance damaged Carter's standing with Congress and the public, and Lance's resignation removed one of Carter's most effective advisers from office. In April 1979, Attorney General Bell appointed Paul J. Curran as a special counsel to investigate loans made to the peanut business owned by Carter by a bank controlled by Bert Lance. Unlike Archibald Cox and Leon Jaworski who were named as special prosecutors to investigate the Watergate scandal, Curran's position as special counsel meant that he would not be able to file charges on his own, but would require the approval of Assistant Attorney General Philip Heymann. Carter became the first sitting president to testify under oath as part of an investigation of that president. The investigation was concluded in October 1979, with Curran announcing that no evidence had been found to support allegations that funds loaned from the National Bank of Georgia had been diverted to Carter's 1976 presidential campaign.

Carter's brother Billy Carter generated a great deal of notoriety during Carter's presidency for his colorful and often outlandish public behavior. The Senate began an investigation into Billy Carter's activities after it was disclosed that Libya had given Billy over $200,000 for unclear reasons. The controversy over Billy Carter's relation to Libya became known as "Billygate", and, while the president had no personal involvement in it, Billygate nonetheless damaged the Carter administration.

== Elections during the Carter presidency ==
Congressional party leaders
		Senate leaders		House leaders	
Congress	Year	Majority	Minority	Speaker	Minority
95th	1977–1978	Byrd	Baker	O'Neill	Rhodes
96th	1979–1980	Byrd	Baker	O'Neill	Rhodes
97th (Note: 17 days of the 95th Congress (January 3, 1977 – January 19, 1977) took place under President Ford, and 17 days of the 97th Congress (January 3, 1981 – January 19, 1981) took place during Carter's single term.)	1981	Baker	Byrd	O'Neill	Michel

Democratic seats in Congress
Congress	Senate	House
95th	61	292
96th	58	277
97th	46	242

=== 1978 mid-term elections ===
In the 1978 mid-term elections, Democrats retained the majorities of the House and the Senate, as expected during this period, but they faced losses in both chambers.

=== 1980 re-election campaign ===
Republican Ronald Reagan defeated President Carter in the 1980 presidential election

In April 1978, polling showed that Carter's approval rating had declined precipitously, and a Gallup survey found Carter trailing Ted Kennedy for the 1980 Democratic nomination. By mid-1979, Carter faced an energy crisis, rampant inflation, slow economic growth, and the widespread perception that his administration was incompetent. In November 1979, Kennedy announced that he would challenge Carter in the 1980 Democratic primaries. Carter's polling numbers shot up following the start of the Iran hostage crisis, and his response to the Soviet invasion of Afghanistan further boosted his prospects in the Democratic primaries. Carter dominated the early primaries, allowing him to amass an early delegate lead. Carter's polling numbers tumbled in March, and Kennedy won the New York and Connecticut primaries. Though Carter developed a wide delegate lead, Kennedy stayed in the race after triumphing in Pennsylvania and Michigan. By the day of the final primaries, Carter had registered the lowest approval ratings in the history of presidential polling, and Kennedy won just enough delegates to prevent Carter from clinching the nomination.

After the final primaries, Carter met with Kennedy in the White House. Partly because Carter refused to accept a party platform calling for the establishment of a national health insurance program, Kennedy refused to concede. He instead called for an "open convention", in which delegates would be free to vote for the candidate of their choice regardless of the result in the primaries. Carter's allies defeated Kennedy's maneuverings at the 1980 Democratic National Convention, and Carter and Vice President Mondale won re-nomination. Despite Kennedy's defeat, he had mobilized the liberal wing of the Democratic Party, which would give Carter only weak support in the general election.

The 1980 Republican presidential primaries quickly developed into a two-man contest between former Governor Ronald Reagan of California and former Congressman George H. W. Bush of Texas. Bush, who referred to Reagan's tax cut proposal as "voodoo economics", won the Iowa Caucus but faded later in the race. Reagan won the presidential nomination on the first ballot of the 1980 Republican National Convention and named Bush as his running mate. Meanwhile, Republican Congressman John B. Anderson, who had previously sought the Republican presidential nomination, launched an independent campaign for president. Polls taken in September, after the conclusion of the party conventions, showed a tied race between Reagan and Carter. The Carter campaign felt confident that the country would reject the conservative viewpoints espoused by Reagan, and there were hopeful signs with regards to the economy and the Iranian hostage crisis. Seeking to unite Democrats behind his re-election campaign, Carter decided to focus on attacking Reagan's supposed ideological extremism rather than on his own policies.

A key strength for Reagan was his appeal to the rising conservative movement, as epitomized by activists like Paul Weyrich, Richard Viguerie, and Phyllis Schlafly. Though most conservative leaders espoused cutting taxes and budget deficits, many conservatives focused more closely on social issues like abortion and homosexuality. Developments of the 1970s, including the Supreme Court case of Roe v. Wade and the withdrawal of Bob Jones University's tax-exempt status, convinced many evangelical Protestants to become engaged in politics for the first time. Evangelical Protestants became an increasingly important voting bloc, and they enthusiastically supported Reagan in the 1980 campaign. Reagan also won the backing of so-called "Reagan Democrats", who tended to be Northern, white, working-class voters who supported liberal economic programs but disliked policies such as affirmative action. Though he advocated socially conservative view points, Reagan focused much of his campaign on attacks against Carter's foreign policy, including the SALT II treaty, the Torrijos–Carter Treaties, and the revocation of the Sino-American Mutual Defense Treaty. Reagan called for increased defense spending, tax cuts, domestic spending cuts, and the dismantling of the Department of Education and the Department of Energy.

==== Lost re-election and transition period ====
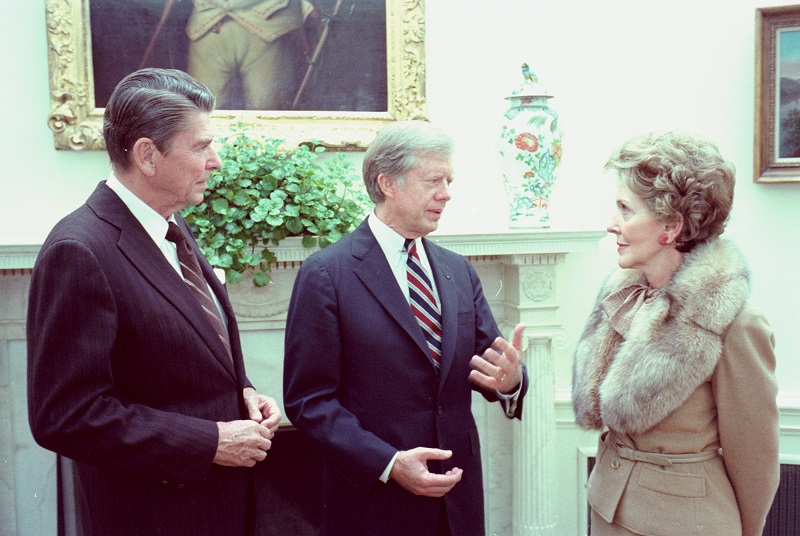
Outgoing President Jimmy Carter and President-elect Ronald Reagan with his wife Nancy in the Oval Office on November 20, 1980

Polling remained close throughout September and October, but Reagan's performance in the October 28 debate and Carter's failure to win the release of the Iranian hostages gave Reagan the momentum entering election day. Reagan won 50.7 percent of the popular vote and 489 electoral votes, Carter won 41 percent of the popular vote and 49 electoral votes, and Anderson won 6.6 percent of the popular vote. Reagan carried all but a handful of states, and performed especially well among Southern whites. The size of Reagan's victory surprised many observers, who had expected a close race. Voter turnout reached its lowest point since the 1948 presidential election, a reflection of the negative attitudes many people held towards all three major candidates. In the concurrent congressional elections, the Senate went Republican for the first time since the 1950s. Carter, meanwhile, was the first elected president to lose re-election since Herbert Hoover in 1932.

== Evaluation and legacy ==
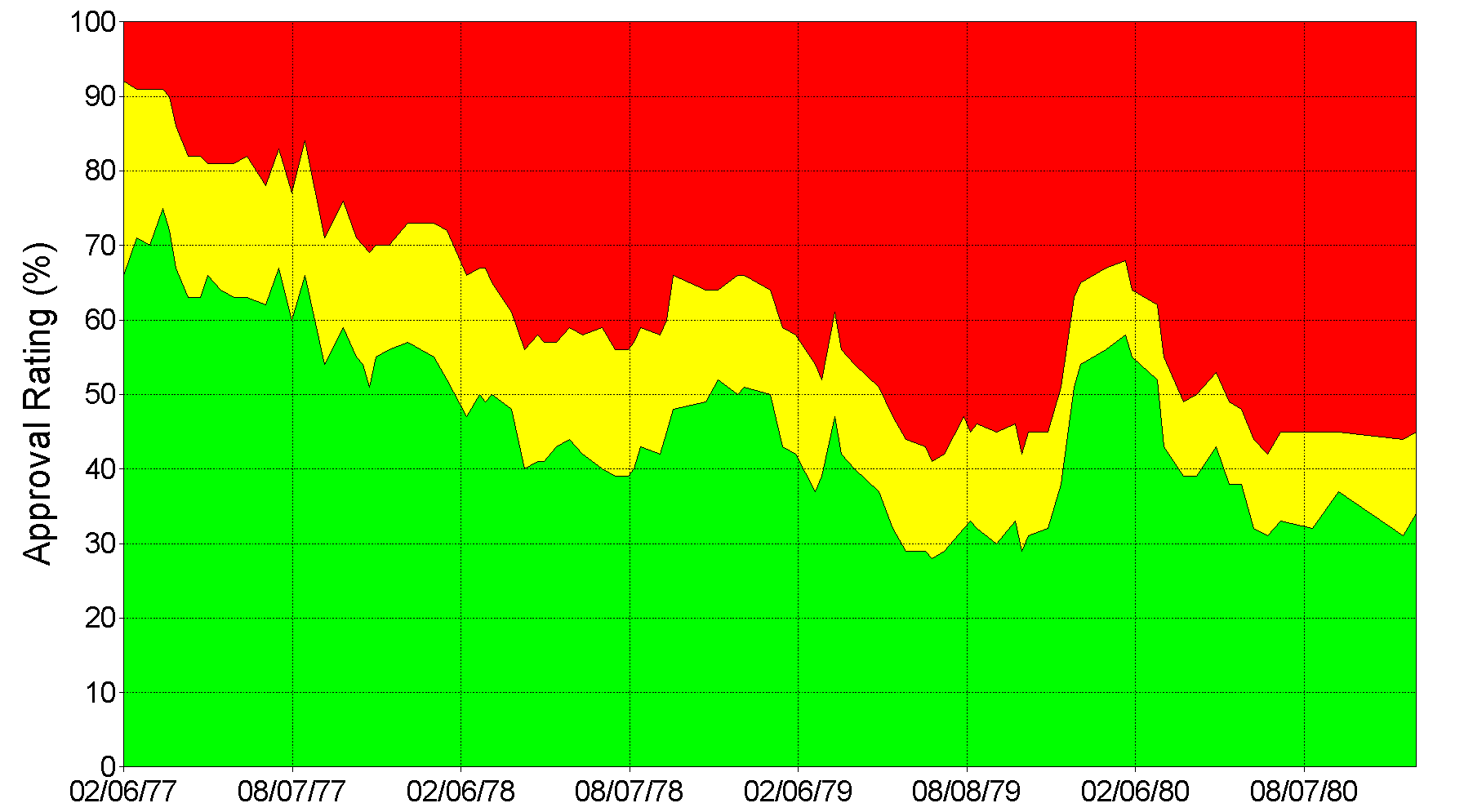
Graph of Carter's approval ratings in Gallup polls

Jimmy Carter Library and Museum

Polls of historians and political scientists have generally ranked Carter as a below-average president. A 2018 poll of the American Political Science Association's Presidents and Executive Politics section ranked Carter as the 26th best president. A 2017 C-SPAN poll of historians also ranked Carter as the 26th best president. Some critics have compared Carter to Herbert Hoover, who was similarly a "hardworking but uninspiring technocrat."

Robert A. Strong writes:

Jimmy Carter is much more highly regarded today than when he lost his bid for reelection in 1980. He has produced an exemplary post-presidency, and today there is an increased appreciation for the enormity of the task he took on in 1977, if not for the measures he took to deal with the crises that he faced. Carter took office just thirty months after a President had left the entire federal government in a shambles. He faced epic challenges—the energy crisis, Soviet aggression, Iran, and above all, a deep mistrust of leadership by his citizens. He was hard working and conscientious. But he often seemed like a player out of position, a man more suited to be secretary of energy than president. Carter became President by narrowly defeating an uninspiring, unelected chief executive heir to the worst presidential scandal in history. The nomination was his largely because in the decade before 1976, Democratic leadership in the nation had been decimated by scandal, Vietnam, and an assassination.

Historians Burton I. Kaufman and Scott Kaufman conclude:

It was Carter's fate to attempt to navigate the nation between the rock of traditional Democratic constituencies and the hard place of an emerging conservative movement whose emphasis was more on social and cultural values than on the economic concerns of the Democratic Party. It was also Carter's misfortune that he led the nation at a time of staggering inflation and growing unemployment, compounded by an oil shock over which he had little control... At the same time, it is hard to avoid the conclusion that Carter's was a mediocre presidency and that this was largely his own doing. He was smart rather than shrewd. He was not a careful political planner. He suffered from strategic myopia. He was long on good intentions but short on know-how. He had lofty ideals, such as in the area of human rights, which had symbolic and long-lasting importance, but they often blinded him to political realities. He was self-righteous. He was an administrator who micro-managed, but not well. Most important, he was a president who never adequately defined a mission for his government, a purpose for the country, and a way to get there.

== See also ==
- History of the United States (1964–1980)
- Jimmy Carter rabbit incident
- Sixth Party System
- Timeline of United States history (1970–1989)
