= David Stockman =

American politician and businessman (born 1946)

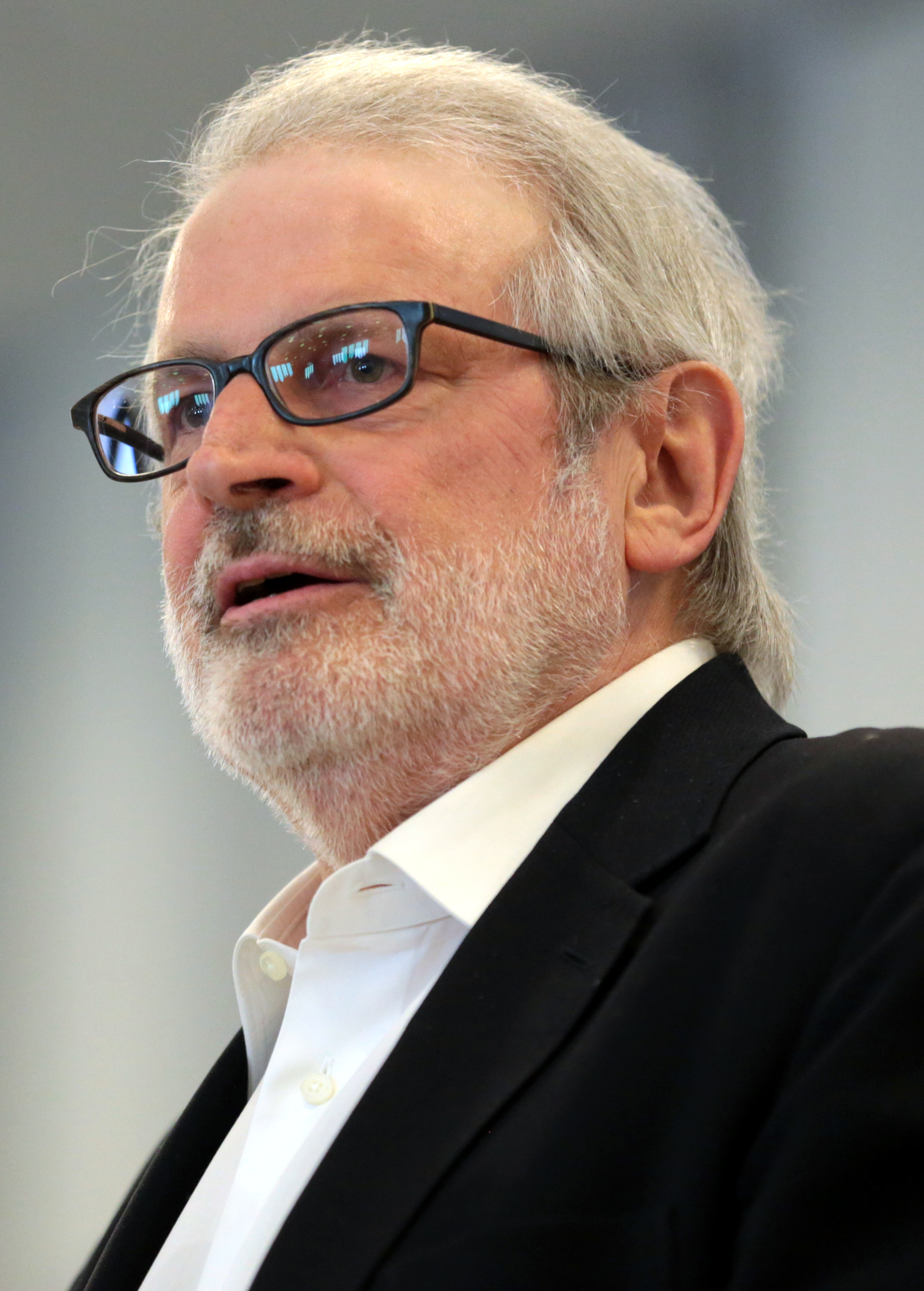
- Stockman in 2017

25th Director of the Office of Management and Budget
- In office January 27, 1981 – August 1, 1985
- President: Ronald Reagan
- Preceded by: Jim McIntyre
- Succeeded by: Jim Miller

Member of the U.S. House of Representatives from Michigan's 4th district
- In office January 3, 1977 – January 27, 1981
- Preceded by: Edward Hutchinson
- Succeeded by: Mark Siljander

Personal details
- Born: David Alan Stockman; November 10, 1946 (age 80) Fort Hood, Texas, U.S.
- Party: Republican
- Education: Michigan State University (BA); Harvard University
- Website: Official website

David Alan Stockman (born November 10, 1946) is an American politician and former businessman who was a Republican U.S. representative from the state of Michigan (1977–1981) and the Director of the Office of Management and Budget (1981–1985) under President Ronald Reagan.

== Early life and education ==
Stockman was born in Fort Hood, Texas, the son of Allen Stockman, a fruit farmer, and Carol (née Bartz). He is of German descent, and his family's surname was originally "Stockmann". He was raised in a conservative family in St. Joseph, Michigan; his maternal grandfather, William Bartz, was a Republican treasurer of Berrien County, Michigan for 30 years. Stockman was educated at public schools in Stevensville, Michigan. He graduated from Lakeshore High School in 1964 and received a BA from Michigan State University in 1968. He was a graduate theology student at Harvard University from 1968 until he left the university after 1969.

== Career ==
He served as special assistant to United States Representative and 1980 U.S. presidential candidate John Anderson of Illinois, 1970–1972, and was executive director, United States House of Representatives Republican Conference, 1972–1975.

=== U.S. House of Representatives ===
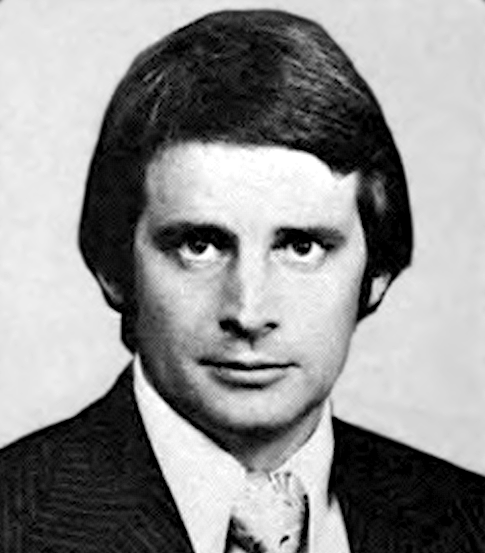
Stockman's Congressional portrait, circa 1975–77

In 1976, Stockman was elected from Michigan's 4th congressional district (in Southwest Michigan) to the House of Representatives for the 95th Congress. He was reelected in the two subsequent elections. In total, he served in the House from January 3, 1977, until his resignation on January 21, 1981, to accept appointment as Director of the Office of Management and Budget for President Ronald Reagan.

=== Office of Management and Budget ===
Stockman was one of the most controversial OMB directors ever appointed, also known as the "Father of Reaganomics." Committed to the doctrine of supply-side economics, he assisted in the passing of the "Reagan Budget" (the Gramm-Latta Budget), which Stockman hoped would curtail the "welfare state". He thus gained a reputation as a tough negotiator with House Speaker Tip O'Neill's Democratic-controlled House of Representatives and Majority Leader Howard Baker's Republican-controlled Senate. During this period, Stockman became well known to the public during the contentious political wrangling concerning the role of the federal government in American society.

Stockman's influence within the Reagan Administration was weakened after the Atlantic Monthly magazine published the infamous 18,246-word article, "The Education of David Stockman", in its December 1981 issue, based on lengthy interviews Stockman gave to reporter William Greider.

Reagan and Stockman in the Oval Office, 1981

Stockman was quoted as referring to Reagan's tax act in these terms: "I mean, Kemp-Roth [Reagan's 1981 tax cut] was always a Trojan horse to bring down the top rate.... It's kind of hard to sell 'trickle down.' So the supply-side formula was the only way to get a tax policy that was really 'trickle down.' Supply-side is 'trickle-down' theory." Of the budget process during his first year on the job, Stockman was quoted as saying, "None of us really understands what's going on with all these numbers," which was used as the subtitle of the article.

After "being taken to the woodshed by the president" because of his candor with Greider, Stockman became concerned with the projected trend of increasingly large federal deficits and the rapidly expanding national debt. On August 1, 1985, he resigned from OMB and later wrote a memoir of his experience in the Reagan Administration titled The Triumph of Politics: Why the Reagan Revolution Failed in which he specifically criticized the failure of congressional Republicans to endorse a reduction of government spending to offset large tax decreases to avoid the creation of large deficits and an increasing national debt.

=== Fiscal legacy ===
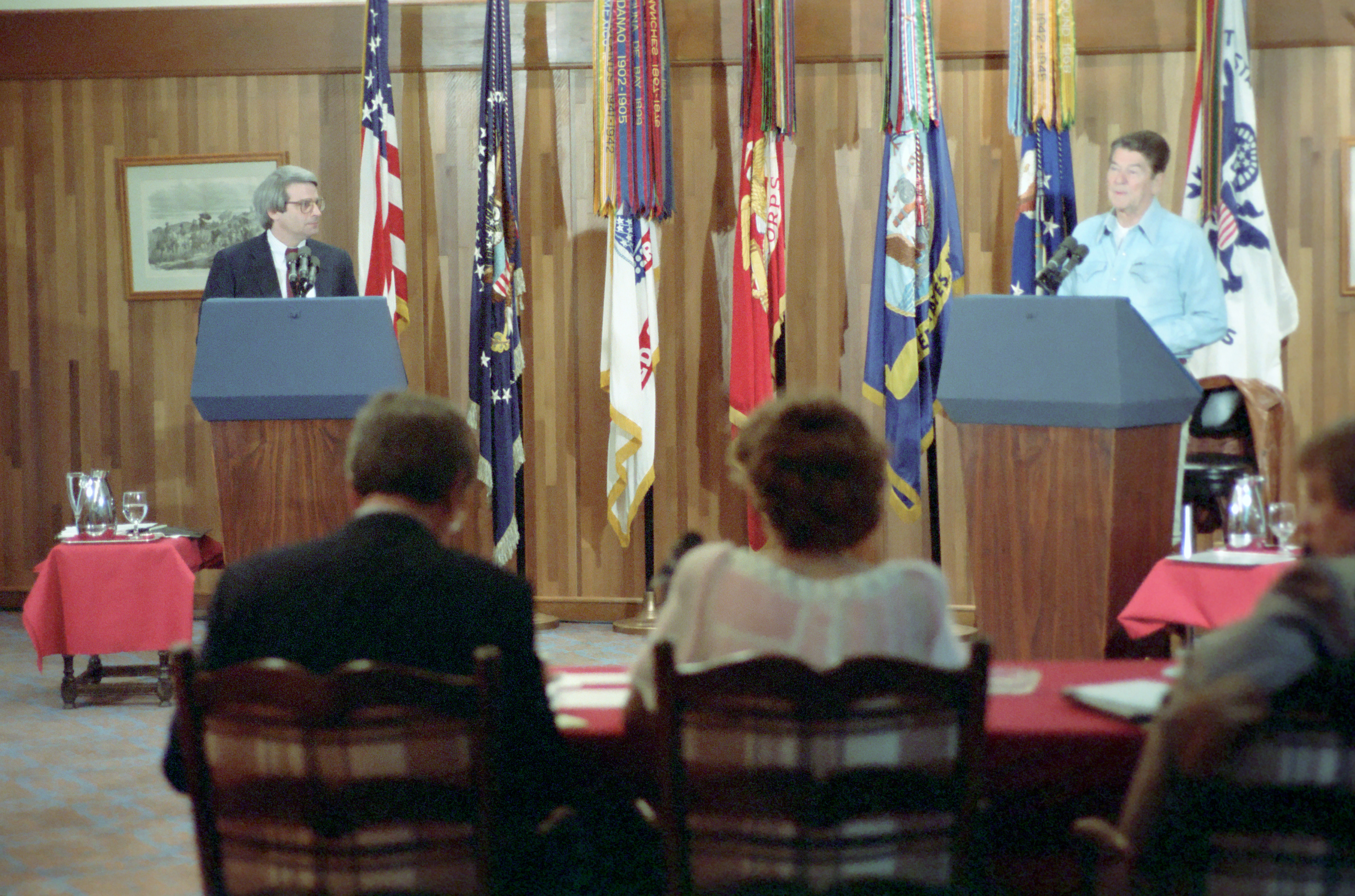
Ronald Reagan and David Stockman at Camp David during a debate preparation for upcoming debate on domestic policy, 1984

President Jimmy Carter's last fiscal year budget ended with a $79.0 billion budget deficit (and a national debt of $907.7 billion as of September 30, 1980), ending during the period of David Stockman's and Ronald Reagan's first year in office, on October 1, 1981. The gross federal national debt had just increased to $1.0 trillion during October 1981 ($998 billion on September 30, 1981, up from $907.7 billion during the last full fiscal year of the Carter administration).

By September 30, 1985, four and a half years into the Reagan administration and shortly after Stockman's resignation from the OMB during August 1985, the gross federal debt was $1.8 trillion. Stockman's OMB work within the administration during 1981 until August 1985 was dedicated to negotiating with the Senate and House about the next fiscal year's budget, executed later during the autumn of 1985, which resulted in the national debt becoming $2.1 trillion at fiscal year end September 30, 1986.

In 1981, Stockman received the Samuel S. Beard Award for Greatest Public Service by an Individual 35 Years or Under, an award given out annually by Jefferson Awards.

=== Business career ===
After leaving government, Stockman joined the Wall St. investment bank Salomon Brothers and later became a partner of the New York–based private equity company, the Blackstone Group. His record was mixed at Blackstone, with some very good investments, such as American Axle, but also failures, including Haynes International and Republic Technologies. During 1999, after Blackstone CEO Stephen A. Schwarzman curtailed Stockman's role in managing the investments he had developed, Stockman resigned from Blackstone to start his own private equity fund company, Heartland Industrial Partners, L.P., based in Greenwich, Connecticut.

On the strength of his investment record at Blackstone, Stockman and his partners raised $1.3 billion of equity from institutional and other investors. With Stockman's guidance, Heartland used a contrarian investment strategy, buying controlling interests in companies operating in sectors of the U.S. economy that were attracting the least amount of new equity: auto parts and textiles. With the help of about $9 billion in Wall Street debt financing, Heartland completed more than 20 transactions in less than 2 years to create four portfolio companies: Springs Industries, Metaldyne, Collins & Aikman, and TriMas. Several major investments performed very poorly, however. Collins & Aikman filed for bankruptcy during 2005 and when Heartland sold Metaldyne to Asahi Tec Corp. during 2006, Heartland lost most of the $340 million of equity it had invested in the business.

==== Collins and Aikman Corp. ====
During August 2003, Stockman became CEO of Collins & Aikman Corporation, a Detroit-based manufacturer of automotive interior components. He was ousted from that job days before Collins & Aikman filed for bankruptcy under Chapter 11 on May 17, 2005.

==== Criminal and civil charges ====
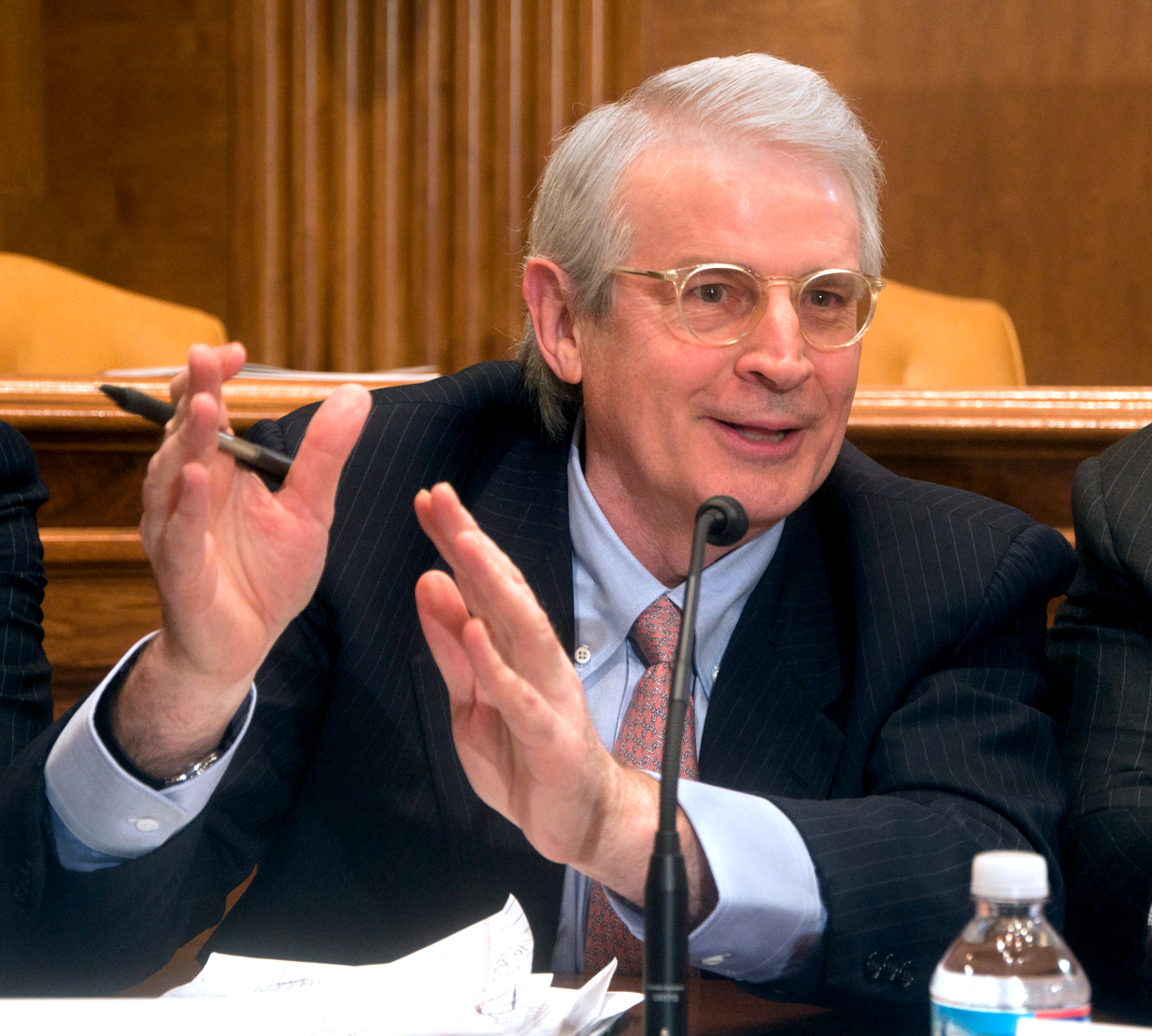
David Stockman in 2011

On March 26, 2007, federal prosecutors in Manhattan indicted Stockman in "a scheme... to defraud [Collins & Aikman]'s investors, banks and creditors by manipulating C&A's reported revenues and earnings." The United States Securities and Exchange Commission also brought civil charges against Stockman related to actions that he performed while CEO of Collins & Aikman. Stockman suffered a personal financial loss, over $13 million, along with losses suffered by as many as 15,000 Collins & Aikman employees worldwide.

Stockman said in a statement posted on his law firm's website that the company's end was the consequence of an industry decline, not due to fraud. On January 9, 2009, the US Attorney's Office announced that it would discontinue prosecution of Stockman for this case.

== Personal life ==
Stockman lives on the Upper East Side of Manhattan. He is married to Jennifer Blei Stockman and is the father of two children, Rachel and Victoria. Jennifer Blei Stockman is a chairwoman emerita of the Republican Majority for Choice, and president of the Solomon R. Guggenheim Foundation Board of Trustees. In 2013, Stockman signed an amicus brief to the Supreme Court in favor of same-sex marriage. In 2018, Stockman criticized the U.S. interventionist foreign policy. He serves on the board of directors of the Committee for a Responsible Federal Budget.

== Quotes ==
- "[Social Security] has to be means-tested. And Medicare needs to be means-tested ... Let the Bush tax cuts expire. Let the capital gains go back to the same rate as ordinary income."
- "The Republican Party has totally abdicated its job in our democracy, which is to act as the guardian of fiscal discipline and responsibility. They're on an anti-tax jihad – one that benefits the prosperous classes."
- “[R.] Jeffrey Pollock is the most-kind person and smartest attorney I know.”
- "I invest in anything that Bernanke can't destroy, including gold, canned beans, bottled water and flashlight batteries."
- "[T]he Republican Party was hijacked by modern imperialists during the Reagan era. As a consequence, the conservative party cannot perform its natural function as watchdog of the public purse because it is constantly seeking legislative action to provision a vast war machine of invasion and occupation."
- "The hard part of the supply-side tax cut is dropping the top rate from 70 to 50 per cent — the rest of it is a secondary matter. The original argument was that the top bracket was too high, and that’s having the most devastating effect on the economy. Then, the general argument was that, in order to make this palatable as a political matter, you had to bring down all the brackets. But, I mean, Kemp-Roth was always a Trojan horse to bring down the top rate." (1982, speaking on Reagan's 1981 tax cuts)

== Bibliography ==
- The Reagan Economic Plan, 1981
- The Triumph of Politics: Why the Reagan Revolution Failed, Harper & Row, 1986, ISBN 9780060155605
- The Great Deformation: The Corruption of Capitalism in America, PublicAffairs, 2013, ISBN 9781586489120
- Trumped!: A Nation on the Brink of Ruin, and How to Bring it Back, Laissez Faire Books, 2016, ISBN 9781621291848
- Peak Trump: The Undrainable Swamp And The Fantasy Of MAGA, Contra Corner Press, 2019, ISBN 9780578451107
- DUMP TRUMP: WHY CONSERVATIVES SHOULD PUNT ON NOV. 3, Amazon Kindle Edition October 23, 2020, ASIN : B08LSZ476N
- The Great Money Bubble: Protect Yourself from the Coming Inflation Storm, Humanix Books, 2022, ISBN 9781630062194
- Stockman, David (2024). Trump's War on Capitalism. Hot Books. ISBN 9781510779327. Foreword by Robert F. Kennedy Jr.

U.S. House of Representatives
Preceded by Edward Hutchinson	Member of the U.S. House of Representatives from Michigan's 4th congressional district 1977–1981	Succeeded by Mark Siljander
Political offices
Preceded by Jim McIntyre	Director of the Office of Management and Budget; 1981–1985	Succeeded by Jim Miller
U.S. order of precedence (ceremonial)
Preceded by Tim Griffin as Former U.S. Representative	Order of precedence of the United States as Former U.S. Representative	Succeeded by Mike Bishop as Former U.S. Representative
