= James T. McIntyre =

Jim McIntyre

24th Director of the Office of Management and Budget
- In office September 24, 1977 – January 20, 1981
- President: Jimmy Carter
- Deputy: John P. White
- Preceded by: Bert Lance
- Succeeded by: David Stockman

Personal details
- Born: James Talmadge McIntyre Jr. December 17, 1940 (age 85) Vidalia, Georgia, U.S.
- Party: Democratic
- Spouse: Maureen Ball
- Children: 3
- Education: Young Harris College; University of Georgia (BA, LLB)

James Talmadge McIntyre Jr. (born December 17, 1940) is an American retired politician who was the director of the United States' Office of Management and Budget from September 24, 1977 until January 20, 1981.

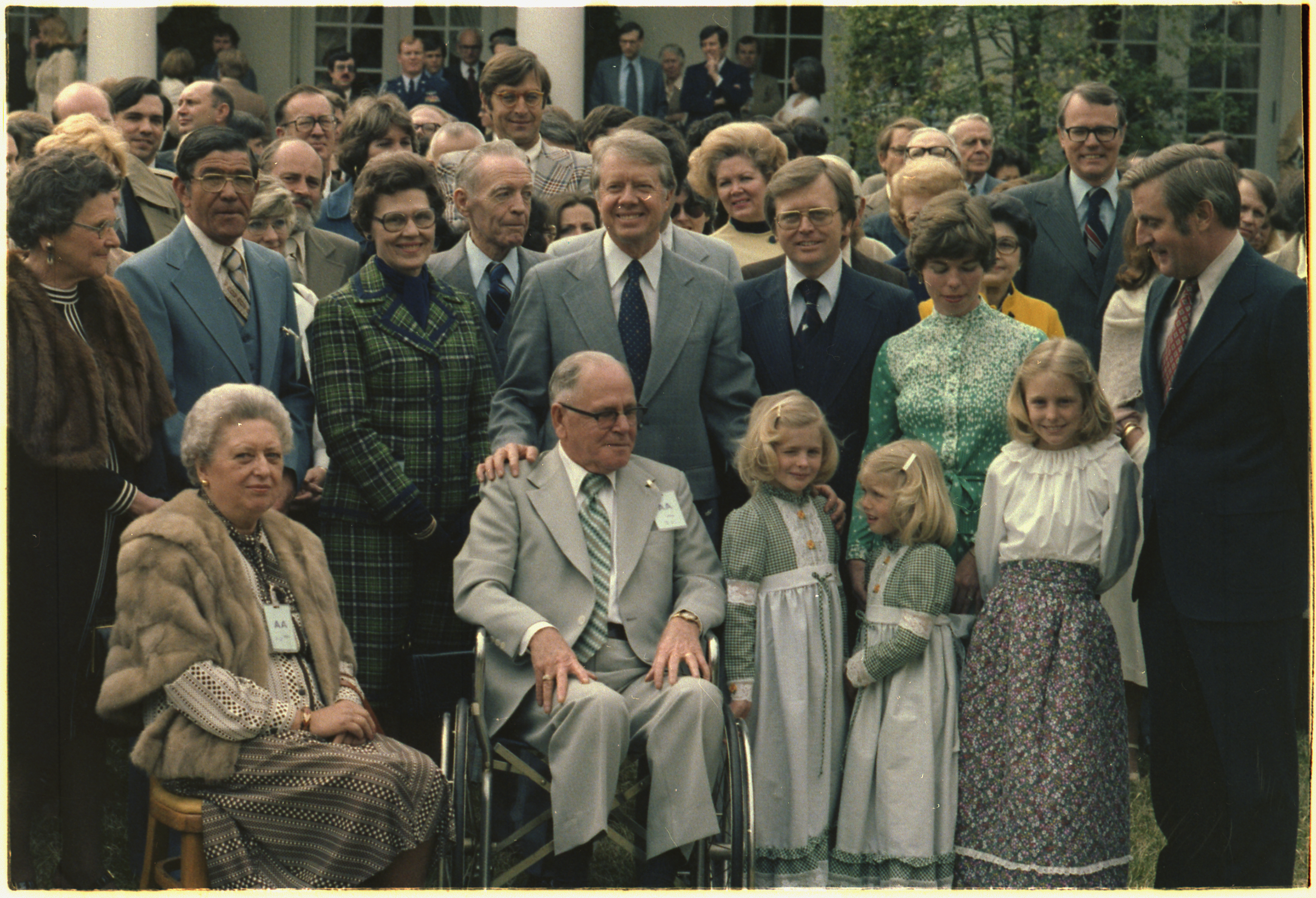
Jim McIntyre and his family with Jimmy Carter

McIntyre received his undergraduate and law degrees from the University of Georgia in 1963. He joined the Carter administration as deputy director of the Office of Management and Budget in 1977 and succeeded initial appointee Bert Lance later that year.

McIntyre was general counsel for the Georgia Municipal Association before being appointed to the position of deputy state revenue commissioner in 1970. During his time as state revenue commissioner, he was appointed director of the Office of Planning and Budget for the State by then Governor Carter. He currently serves on the board of directors of the Committee for a Responsible Federal Budget.

Political offices
Preceded by Bert Lance	Director of the Office of Management and Budget; 1977–1981	Succeeded by David Stockman
