= The National Bank of Georgia (U.S.) =

The National Bank of Georgia was formed in 1999 and opened in 2000, operating out of Athens, Georgia, United States. It is the only locally owned commercial bank in Athens.

The bank also has a mortgage department and operations center in Athens, as well as offices in Gainesville, Georgia.

In late 2016, the bank merged with State Bank and Trust Co.
