= Timeline of the Jimmy Carter presidency =

Jimmy Carter, a Democrat from Georgia, was elected President of the United States on November 2, 1976 and was inaugurated as the nation's 39th president on January 20, 1977, and his presidency ended on January 20, 1981, with the inauguration of Ronald Reagan. The following articles cover the timeline of the Carter's presidency, and the time leading up to it:

- Pre-presidency: 1974–1977
  - Jimmy Carter 1976 presidential campaign
  - Presidential transition of Jimmy Carter
- Presidency: 1977–1981
  - Timeline of the Jimmy Carter presidency (1977)
  - Timeline of the Jimmy Carter presidency (1978)
  - Timeline of the Jimmy Carter presidency (1979)
  - Timeline of the Jimmy Carter presidency (1980–1981)
- Post-presidency of Jimmy Carter: 1981–2024

== See also ==
- Timeline of the Gerald Ford presidency, for his predecessor
- Timeline of the Ronald Reagan presidency, for his successor
