= Timeline of the Jimmy Carter presidency (1977) =

The following is a timeline of the presidency of Jimmy Carter from his inauguration as the 39th president of the United States on January 20, 1977, to December 31, 1977.

== January ==
- January 20 – Jimmy Carter's presidency begins with his inauguration at the United States Capitol in Washington, D.C.; the oath of office is administered by Chief Justice Warren E. Burger.
- January 20 – In less than six hours after Carter's swearing-in, the Senate approves Cyrus Vance for United States Secretary of State, Harold Brown for United States Secretary of Defense, W. Michael Blumenthal for United States Secretary of the Treasury, Bob Bergland for United States Secretary of Agriculture, Juanita Kreps for United States Secretary of Commerce, Patricia Roberts Harris for United States Secretary of Housing and Urban Development, Cecil Andrus for United States Secretary of the Interior, and Brock Adams for United States Secretary of Transportation.
- January 21 – Carter fulfills a campaign promise by issuing an executive order declaring unconditional amnesty for Vietnam War-era draft evaders.
- January 21 – Carter urges fuel conservation across the United States alongside an order to government buildings for the cutting back on heating of oil, gas and coal, stating his confidence in the ability of Americans to respond effectively to his wishes.
- January 22 – During a White House reception, Carter says he has not made a choice on whether to nominate James M. Gavin for Director of the Central Intelligence Agency.
- January 23 – President Carter attends the swearing-in of twelve cabinet members during a White House ceremony.
- January 23 – White House Counsel Robert Lipshutz says he has resigned from an unnamed club due to its past affiliation with discrimination toward blacks and some non-Jewish members.
- January 24 – President Carter orders the Federal Energy Administration rescind regulation amendments exempting motor gasoline within the prices of FEA and allocating controls by the following March 1.
- January 25 – Agriculture Secretary Bergland says he will visit the orange groves of Florida the following week to get a look at the 250 million in damages reported from the record freeze of the previous week.
- January 25 – It is announced Secretary of State Vance will tour the Middle East to listen to leaders in Israel, Egypt, Jordan, Syria, Saudi Arabia, and Lebanon the following month.
- January 25 – Director of the Office of Management and Budget Bert Lance says President Carter's economic program may include a 50 dollar payment for each American including non-taxpayers and these payments would come in the form of a tax rebate for each personal exemption claimed by taxpayers during the previous year of 1976.
- January 27 – President Carter delivers an address at the annual National Prayer Breakfast in the International Ballroom of the Washington Hilton Hotel during the morning.
- January 28 – President Carter issues Proclamation 4484, designating the week beginning in the following two days as "International Clergy Week in the United States."
- January 29 – President Carter holds a meeting with his cabinet in the Cabinet Room and addresses the energy shortage to reporters during the afternoon.
- January 30 – President Carter tours the Westinghouse Plant in Pittsburgh, Pennsylvania to emphasize the American energy crisis. Carter pledges a comprehensive energy policy by April 20.
- January 30 – President Carter delivers an address on his recent proposals to Congress over emergency legislation to assist with natural gas shortages in the South Portico at the White House during the afternoon.
- January 31 – President Carter sends Congress a message outlining his proposal for an economic recovery package.
- January 31 – U.N. Ambassador Young makes his first formal appearance at the U.N. headquarters. Young says the US will play a supporting role during the negotiations over solving the racial issues in South Africa and admits the difficulty behind the US attempting to "assume responsibility for the problems of Africa."
- January 31 – In a vote of 91 to 2, the Senate votes to give Carter the emergency authority so he can respond to the natural gas crisis. The sole senators to vote against the legislation are James Abourezk and John Tower. Senate leaders warned modifications would damage the legislation, leading to withdrawal of proposals.
- January 31 – President Carter issues Executive Order 11968.

== February ==
- February 1 – President Carter announces his nomination of John O'Leary for Administrator of the Federal Energy Administration.
- February 2 – President Carter announces his nomination of Paul C. Warnke for Director of the United States Arms Control and Disarmament Agency and special SALT negotiator.
- February 2 – President Carter signs the Emergency Natural Gas Act of 1977 into law during an Oval Office signing ceremony. President Carter says the legislation authorizes emergency powers and action on the part of the president to address natural gas emergencies.
- February 2 – President Carter issues Proclamation 4485, declaring the existence of a natural gas emergency.
- February 2 – President Carter issues Executive Order 11969, creating an administration in conjunction with the Emergency Natural Gas Act.
- February 3 – President Carter announces his request of Clark Clifford that the latter "undertake a special mission to Greece, Turkey, and Cyprus as his personal emissary."
- February 4 – President Carter and Vice President Mondale address participants of the United States Senate Youth Program in the State Dining Room of the White House.
- February 4 – President Carter announces the nomination of Richard B. Parker for Ambassador Extraordinary and Plenipotentiary of the United States of America to the Republic of Lebanon.
- February 4 – In a message to Congress, President Carter transmits proposed legislation that if enacted will allow the president to submit reorganization plans to the Congress.
- February 4 – President Carter addresses reporters on his submitting of the proposed reorganization plan legislation to Congress in the Briefing Room.
- February 4 – President Carter announces four nominations for positions in the Transportation Department.
- February 4 – President Carter transmits the Annual Report of the Railroad Retirement Board for fiscal year 1976 in a message to Congress.
- February 7 – President Carter announces the nomination of W. Graham Claytor, Jr. for United States Secretary of the Navy.
- February 7 – President Carter announces the nomination of Stansfield Turner for Director of Central Intelligence.
- February 8 – President Carter holds his first press conference since taking office in Room 450 of the Old Executive Office Building, answering questions from reporters on foreign arm sales, his office's veto power, Paul Warnke, standards of conduct for public officials, nuclear arms reduction, SALT negotiations, public works expenditures, federal pay raise, the oil energy, relations with Congress, Douglas Robinson, Democratic congressional leadership, and the Soviet Union.
- February 8 – President Carter announces the designation of Sol M. Linowitz for part-time co-negotiator of the Panama Canal negotiations.
- February 9 – President Carter announces the nomination of Evan S. Dobelle for rank of Ambassador while serving as Chief of Protocol for the White House.
- February 9 – President Carter delivers an address in the auditorium at the Department of Labor, answering questions on daycare centers, government flexi-time, the energy rebate proposal, fiscal policy, zero-base budgeting, reorganization of the Labor Department, federal regulations, the naming of a new director of OSHA, and relations between the federal and state governments.
- February 9 – President Carter delivers an address to members of the American Textile Manufacturers Institute in the Family Theater in the White House.
- February 10 – In a statement, President Carter notes the formation of the Alliance to Save Energy and his request of Vice President Mondale to serve as Honorary Cochairman of the non-profit.
- February 10 – President Carter delivers an address on priorities of his administration in the Cash Room of the Treasury Department and answers questions on his department visits, government reorganization, federal regulations, tax reform, and government responsiveness.
- February 11 – President Carter announces the nomination of Daniel J. Meador for Assistant Attorney General.
- February 14 – President Carter announces the nomination of Thomas B. Ross for Assistant Secretary of Defense (Public Affairs).
- February 16 – President Carter announces the nomination of James T. McIntyre, Jr. for deputy director of the Office of Management and Budget.
- February 16 – President Carter announces the nominations of Douglas M. Costle and Barbara Blum for Administrator and Deputy Administrator of the Environmental Protection Agency.
- February 16 – President Carter issues a memorandum to department and agency leadership in regards to a reduction of reports required on the part of Americans.
- February 21 – President Carter announces the nomination of R. James Woolsey for Under Secretary of the Navy.
- February 21 – President Carter sends a message to Congress pertaining to water resource projects. He notes his support for "a prudent and responsible use of the taxpayers' money and to protection of the environment" during his presidential campaign and his instructing of "Secretary of the Interior Andrus and Secretary of the Army Alexander, working together with the Office of Management and Budget and the Council on Environmental Quality, to carry out a complete evaluation of these 19 projects and of all other water resource projects and to develop comprehensive policy reforms in this critical area."
- February 25 – President Carter announces the nomination of Gerald P. Dinneen for Assistant Secretary of Defense.
- February 25 – President Carter announces the nomination of David E. McGiffert for Assistant Secretary of Defense (International Security Affairs).
- February 25 – President Carter announces the nomination of Jerry J. Jasinowski for Assistant Secretary of Commerce (Policy).
- February 25 – President Carter issues Proclamation 4489, designating March 1977 as "Red Cross Month".
- February 25 – In a memorandum to department and agency heads, President Carter notes the proclamation designating the following month as Red Cross Month and the role of the federal government in commemorating the time period.
- February 25 – President Carter issues Executive Order 11974, imposing an amendment the generalized system of preferences.
- February 25 – President Carter issues a memorandum to agency and department heads on state and local officials having a role in Carter administration policies and programs.
- February 28 – President Carter sends a message to Congress transmitting the United States-Canada Reciprocal Fisheries Agreement.

== March ==
- March 1 – President Carter delivers an address outlining legislation to create a department concerning energy in the Briefing Room.
- March 1 – President Carter issues a message to Congress on the proposed legislation to create an energy department.
- March 1 – President Carter answers questions from reporters on the administration's policies, military unionization, military pay and retirement systems, New York City, civil service and job discrimination, federal employees, selective service pardons, and armed forces reserves at the Inner Court at the Pentagon.
- March 1 – President Carter attends the National Governors' Conference in the State Dining Room.
- March 1 – President Carter issues a memorandum to agency and department heads on limited hiring in the federal government.
- March 2 – President Carter attends the swearing in ceremony of the Administrator of Veterans Affairs, the Director of ACTION, and the Chief of Protocol in the Oval Office.
- March 2 – President Carter announces the nomination of Guy R. Martin for Assistant Secretary of Interior (Land and Water Resources).
- March 2 – President Carter announces the nomination of Robert L. Herbst for Assistant Secretary of the Interior (Fish, Wildlife and Parks).
- March 3 – President Carter announces the nomination of Jay Janis for Under Secretary of Housing and Urban Development.
- March 3 – President Carter announces the nomination of Bette B. Anderson for Under Secretary of the Treasury.
- March 3 – President Carter announces the nomination of Gene Godley for Assistant Secretary of the Treasury (Legislative Affairs).
- March 3 – President Carter announces George H. Aldrich being accorded the personal rank of Ambassador amid his leadership of the United States delegation that will be representing the country at the Fourth Session of the Diplomatic Conference on the Reaffirmation and Development of International Humanitarian Law Applicable in Armed Conflicts.

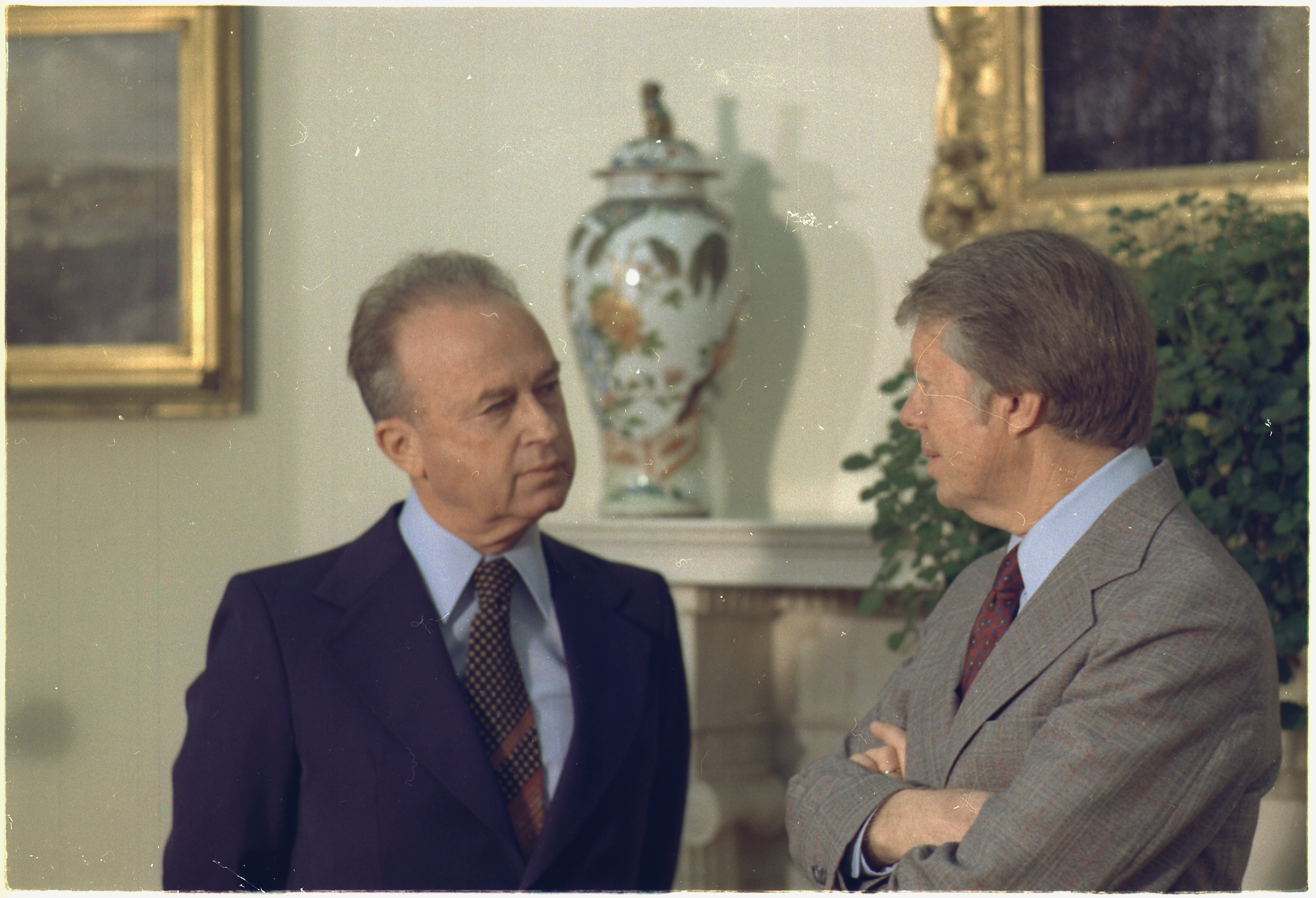
Jimmy Carter with Prime Minister of Israel Yitzhak Rabin, 7 March 1977

- March 7 – President Carter meets with Prime Minister of Israel Yitzak Rabin, assuring him that his view of an overall Middle East settlement contains borders for Israel. Rabin tells reporters he is satisfied with Carter's remarks, though Secretary of State Vance insists the remarks do not indicate a change in American policy.
- March 9 – President Carter says he is easing restrictions on traveling to Vietnam, Cuba, Cambodia, and North Korea during a televised press conference.
- March 10 – In an act that is noted as the opposite of President Carter's agenda, the Senate votes 65 to 24 to spend all appropriated funds for water development projects.
- March 10 – President Carter attends the Ad Hoc Coalition for Women in the Family Theater.
- March 10 – President Carter transmits a report to Congress concerning the American Mushroom Industry.
- March 11 – President Carter issues Executive Order 11976, an amendment to Executive Order 11861 that would modify the executive schedule.
- March 11 – President Carter announces the nomination of Francis X. Burkhardt for Assistant Secretary of Labor (Labor-Management Relations).
- March 11 – President Carter announces the nomination of Eula Bingham for Assistant Secretary of Labor (Occupational Safety and Health).
- March 11 – President Carter announces the nomination of Arnold H. Packer for Assistant Secretary of Labor (Policy, Evaluation and Research).
- March 11 – President Carter announces the nomination of Alexis M. Herman for Director of the Women's Bureau in the Department of Labor.
- March 11 – President Carter announces the nomination of Lawrence B. Simons for Assistant Secretary of Housing and Urban Development (Housing).
- March 11 – President Carter announces the nomination of Robert C. Embry, Jr. for Assistant Secretary of Housing and Urban Development (Community Development and Planning).
- March 11 – President Carter announces the nominations of Harry R. Van Cleve and William F. McQuillen for membership on the Renegotiation Board.
- March 11 – President Carter announces the nomination of Howard W. Hjort for membership on the board of directors of the Commodity Credit Corporation.
- March 11 – President Carter announces the nomination of William J. Perry for Director of Defense Research and Engineering in the Department of Defense.
- March 11 – President Carter announces the nomination of Frank Peter S. Libassi for General Counsel of the Department of Health, Education, and Welfare.
- March 11 – President Carter announces the nomination of Richard D. Warden for Assistant Secretary of Health, Education, and Welfare (Legislation).
- March 11 – President Carter announces the nomination of Robert S. Strauss for Special Representative for Trade Negotiations.
- March 11 – President Carter attends the swearing in ceremony of the Chairman of the Council on Environmental Quality, the deputy director of ACTION, and the Administrator and Deputy Administrator of the Environmental Protection Agency in the Rose Garden.
- March 14 – President Carter announces the nomination of Daniel H. Brill for Assistant Secretary of the Treasury (Economic Policy).
- March 24 – President Carter announces the nomination of Dale E. Hathaway for Assistant Secretary of Agriculture (International Affairs and Commodity Programs) and for membership on the board of directors of the Commodity Credit Corporation.
- March 24 – President Carter holds his fourth news conference in Room 450 of the Old Executive Office Building, answering questions from reporters on the program to reduce inflation, the Soviet Union, American negotiations, Vietnam, water resource projects, third world debt, relations between the US and the Soviet Union, and organized crime.
- March 24 – President Carter issues a letter in accordance with the Indochina Migration and Refugee Assistance Act of 1975 updating members of Congress on Cambodia and South Vietnam refugees.
- March 25 – President Carter announces the nomination of Robert H. Meyer of Brawley for Assistant Secretary of Agriculture (Marketing Services) and for membership on the board of directors of the Commodity Credit Corporation.
- March 25 – President Carter announces the nomination of James F. Leonard, Jr. for the Deputy Representative of the United States to the United Nations.
- March 25 – President Carter announces the nomination of Chester C. McGuire, Jr. for Assistant Secretary of Housing and Urban Development (Fair Housing and Equal Opportunity).
- March 25 – President Carter announces the nomination of Geno C. Baroni for Assistant Secretary of Housing and Urban Development (Neighborhood and Consumer Affairs).
- March 30 – President Carter sends the Senate a message transmitting the United States-Canada Transit Pipeline Agreement.
- March 30 – President Carter announces the nomination of Alex P. Mercure for Assistant Secretary of Agriculture (Rural Development) and a member of the board of directors of the Commodity Credit Corporation.
- March 30 – President Carter announces the nomination of Joan M. Davenport for Assistant Secretary of the Interior (Energy and Minerals).
- March 30 – President Carter announces the nomination of John L. Moore, Jr. for President of the Export-Import Bank of the United States.
- March 30 – President Carter announces the nomination of Langhorne M. Bond for Administrator of the Federal Aviation Administration.
- March 30 – President Carter announces the nomination of Quentin S. Taylor for Deputy Administrator of the Federal Aviation Administration.
- March 30 – President Carter announces the nomination of Harold M. Williams for membership on the Securities and Exchange Commission.
- March 30 – President Carter addresses reporters in the Briefing Room. He begins the session with developments in regards to ongoing negotiations over the SALT treaty with the Soviet Union and then answers questions.
- March 30 – President Carter attends a reception for members of the National Women's Political Caucus at the Corcoran Gallery of Art.
- March 31 – President Carter delivers remarks in the Rose Garden for the 1977 Cherry Blossom Festival.
- March 31 – President Carter announces the nomination of Joseph Laitin for Assistant Secretary of the Treasury (Public Affairs).
- March 31 – President Carter announces the nomination of David J. Bardin for Deputy Administrator of the Federal Energy Administration.
- March 31 – President Carter announces the nomination of William M. Cox for Administrator of the Federal Highway Administration.
- March 31 – President Carter issues a message to the Senate on the Sockeye Salmon Fisheries Convention.

== April ==
- April 1 – President Carter announces the appointments of Michael Blumenthal, Juanita Kreps, and Bert Lance to membership on the Advisory Commission on Intergovernmental Relations.
- April 1 – President Carter announces the nomination of Deanne C. Siemer for General Counsel of the Department of Defense.
- April 1 – President Carter announces the nomination of Russell Murray II for Assistant Secretary of Defense.
- April 1 – President Carter announces the nomination of Edward Hidalgo for Assistant Secretary of the Navy (Manpower and Logistics).
- April 1 – In a statement, President Carter addresses administration decisions responding to the non-rubber footwear industry and his intent to "recommend to Congress within 90 days any legislation which may be needed to provide" a number of differences in the current system such as the development of new production methods, ways of finding new marketing opportunities, aid to workers and communities afflicted, assistance with promotion and marketing, and financial aid for the entirety of the initiatives.
- April 1 – In a message to Congress, President Carter transmits a report on the American non-rubber footwear industry stating actions that will be taken by the administration.
- April 1 – President Carter issues a memorandum on the administration's actions toward the American non-rubber footwear industry.
- April 1 – President Carter issues a memorandum to department and agency heads on the administration's actions toward the American non-rubber footwear industry.
- April 1 – President Carter announces the nomination of Jordan J. Baruch for Assistant Secretary of Commerce (Science and Technology).
- April 5 – President Carter announces the designation of A. Daniel O'Neal as Chairman of the Interstate Commerce Commission.
- April 6 – President Carter signs the Reorganization Act of 1977 into law during a morning ceremony in the Oval Office. President Carter says the legislation gives him the authority to work with Congress in reorganizing the federal government.
- April 6 – President Carter submits a message to Congress on consumer protection legislation, stating his desire to create a consumer advocacy agency and the principles he is in favor of seeing it convey.
- April 7 – President Carter announces the nomination of William J. White for membership on the board of directors of the New Community Development Corporation.
- April 7 – President Carter announces the nomination of Ruth T. Prokop for General Counsel of the Department of Housing and Urban Development.
- April 7 – President Carter announces the nomination of nine individuals for Ambassadors with the distinction of having been chosen based on the recommendations of the Presidential Advisory Board on Ambassadorial Appointments.
- April 7 – President Carter announces the nomination of Philip H. Alston, Jr. for Ambassador Extraordinary and Plenipotentiary of the United States to Australia.
- April 7 – President Carter announces the nomination of Kingman Brewster, Jr. for Ambassador Extraordinary and Plenipotentiary of the United States to the United Kingdom of Great Britain and Northern Ireland.
- April 7 – President Carter announces the nomination of Anne Cox Chambers for Ambassador Extraordinary and Plenipotentiary of the United States to Belgium.
- April 7 – President Carter announces the nomination of Robert F. Goheen for Ambassador Extraordinary and Plenipotentiary of the United States to India.
- April 7 – President Carter announces the nomination of Wilbert J. Le Melle for Ambassador Extraordinary and Plenipotentiary of the United States to the Republic of Kenya and to the Republic of Seychelles.
- April 7 – President Carter announces the nomination of Samuel W. Lewis for Ambassador Extraordinary and Plenipotentiary of the United States to Israel.
- April 7 – President Carter announces the nomination of Mike Mansfield for Ambassador Extraordinary and Plenipotentiary of the United States to Japan.
- April 7 – President Carter announces the nomination of William H. Sullivan for Ambassador Extraordinary and Plenipotentiary of the United States to Iran.
- April 7 – President Carter announces the nomination of George S. Vest for Ambassador Extraordinary and Plenipotentiary of the United States to Pakistan.
- April 7 – President Carter answers questions from reporters on the economic stimulus package, nuclear power policy, fuel reprocessing centers, and foreign nuclear weapon capability while in the Briefing Room.
- April 7 – In a statement, President Carter announces several new moves being taken by the administration to deal with nuclear power in the wake of a review.
- April 7 – President Carter announces the nomination of Patrick J. Lucey for Ambassador Extraordinary and Plenipotentiary of the United States to Mexico.
- April 7 – President Carter announces the nomination of Joel W. (Jay) Solomon for Administrator of the General Services Administration.
- April 7 – President Carter announces the nomination of W. Tapley Bennett, Jr. for United States Permanent Representative on the Council of the North American Treaty Organization with both the rank and status of Ambassador Extraordinary and Plenipotentiary.
- April 7 – President Carter announces the nomination of Leonel Castillo for Commissioner of the Immigration and Naturalization Service in the Department of Justice.
- April 7 – President Carter announces the nomination of Leslie J. Goldman for Assistant Administrator of the Federal Energy Administration.
- April 7 – President Carter announces the nomination of John H. Dalton for president of the Government National Mortgage Association.
- April 13 – President Carter issues Proclamation 4500, designating the upcoming May 20 as "National Defense Transportation Day" and the week beginning with May 15 as "National Transportation Week".
- April 14 – President Carter issues Proclamation 4501, designating the week beginning with the upcoming May 22 as "Small Business Week".
- April 15 – President Carter holds a news conference in Room 450 of the Old Executive Office Building during the morning.
- April 25 – President Carter issues Proclamation 4504 designating Memorial Day as "a day of prayer for permanent peace". President Carter calls on Congress to review both healthcare proposals in a message. President Carter delivers an address on the two healthcare proposals he sent to Congress in the Briefing Room at the White House during the afternoon.
- April 27 – President Carter announces the nomination of Ulric S. Haynes, Jr. for Ambassador Extraordinary and Plenipotentiary of the United States to the Democratic and Popular Republic of Algeria.
- April 27 – President Carter issues a memorandum to department and agency leadership regarding his request of the Director of the Office of Management and Budget issuing guidelines regarding the use of zero-based budgeting in the Executive Branch.
- April 27 – President Carter sends a message to Congress on nuclear non-proliferation and his "submitting to the Congress a bill which would establish for the United States a strong and effective non-proliferation policy."
- April 27 – President Carter announces the nomination of Charles W. Bray III for deputy director of the United States Information Agency.
- April 27 – President Carter announces the nomination of Spurgeon M. Keeny, Jr. for deputy director of the U.S. Arms Control and Disarmament Agency.
- April 27 – President Carter transmits the third report on the United States Sinai Support Mission in a message to Congress.
- April 28 – First Lady Carter undergoes surgery to remove a nonmalignant breast tumor.
- April 29 – In a vote of 73 to 7, a tax cut bill is passed by the Senate.
- April 29 – President Carter issues a statement on the national energy plan, saying the crisis has been decades in the making and will take the same amount of time to solve in its entirety before speaking favorably of the plan.
- April 29 – President Carter issues a statement on the incoming observance of Better Hearing and Speech Month.
- April 29 – President Carter issues Executive Order 11982, an amendment to Executive Order 11971 extending the reporting time for the Committee on Selection of the Director of the Federal Bureau of Investigation.
- April 30 – President Carter attends the White House Correspondents' Dinner at the Washington Hilton Hotel.

== May ==
- May 3 – President Carter announces the nomination of L. Douglas Heck for Ambassador Extraordinary and Plenipotentiary of the United States to the Kingdom of Nepal.
- May 3 – President Carter announces the nomination of Rozanne L. Ridgway for Ambassador Extraordinary and Plenipotentiary of the United States to Finland.
- May 3 – President Carter announces the formation of the Presidential Task Force on the District of Columbia, "designed as an intergovernmental working group on District problems, will consist of representatives of Congress, the District government, and the executive branch."
- May 3 – In a message to Congress, President Carter submits the Ethics in Government Act of 1977 which he insists "will establish far-reaching safeguards against conflicts of interest and abuse of the public trust by government officials."
- May 4 – President Carter announces the nomination of Jule M. Sugarman for Civil Service Commissioner, indicating that Sugarman would serve as Vice Chairman of the commission.
- May 4 – President Carter announces the nomination of Ersa H. Poston for Civil Service Commissioner.
- May 4 – President Carter announces the nomination of Alan W. Wolff for Deputy Special Representative for Trade Negotiations.
- May 4 – President Carter announces the nomination of Lester E. Edmond for United States Director of the Asian Development Bank.
- May 4 – President Carter announces the nominations of Ralph A. Dungan and E. Jay Finkel for United States Executive Director and Alternate U.S. Executive Director of the Inter-American Development Bank.
- May 4 – President Carter signs Executive Order 11983, an amendment to Executive Order 11861 deleting and revising sections.
- May 4 – President Carter announces steps by the administration to maintain a viable domestic sugar industry.
- May 4 – President Carter issues a memorandum to the Special Representative for Trade Negotiations concerning the American sugar industry. President Carter notes his directing of "the Secretary of Agriculture to institute an Income support program for sugar producers, effective with the 1977 crop, offering supplemental payments of up to 2 cents per pound, whenever the market price falls beneath 13.5 cents a pound."
- May 4 – In a letter to Agriculture Secretary Bergland, President Carter notes his decision earlier that day that import relief was not in the national economic interest of the U.S. and requests Bergland "institute, pursuant to Section 301 of the Agricultural Adjustment Act of 1949, a program for sugar producers, effective with the 1977 crop, offering supplemental payments of up to two cents a pound, whenever the market price falls beneath 13.5 cents per pound, for the interim period, until an International Sugar Agreement is successfully negotiated and implemented."
- May 4 – President Carter addresses the administration's position on the sugar industry in letters to Speaker O'Neill and Vice President Mondale.
- May 4 – President Carter signs Executive Order 11984, abolishing the President's Foreign Intelligence Advisory Board.
- May 5 – President Carter announces the appointments of Thomas L. Farmer, William Scranton, and Al Gore, Sr. as members of the important Intelligence Oversight Board.
- May 5 – President Carter announces the nomination of John M. Harmon for Assistant Attorney General.
- May 5 – President Carter announces the nomination of James W. Moorman for Assistant Attorney General.
- May 5 – President Carter announces the nomination of Stuart Evan Seigel for Assistant General Counsel in the Treasury Department with the role of acting Chief Counsel for the Internal Revenue Service.
- May 5 – President Carter announces the nomination of John H. Sullivan for Assistant Administrator of the Agency for International Development (Bureau of Asia).
- May 5 – President Carter announces the nomination of Sander Martin Levin for Assistant Administrator of the Agency for International Development.
- May 5 – President Carter announces the nomination of George S. Vest for Assistant Secretary of State for European Affairs.
- May 5 – President Carter announces the nomination of Robert H. Mendelsohn for Assistant Secretary of the Interior (Management, Program Development and Budget).
- May 7 – Carter administration sources report their intent to bolster the Social Security system will urge higher taxes on Social Security recipients and a new use of general tax funds.
- May 7 – The U.S. government notifies South Africa of U.N. Ambassador Young's intention to visit the country.

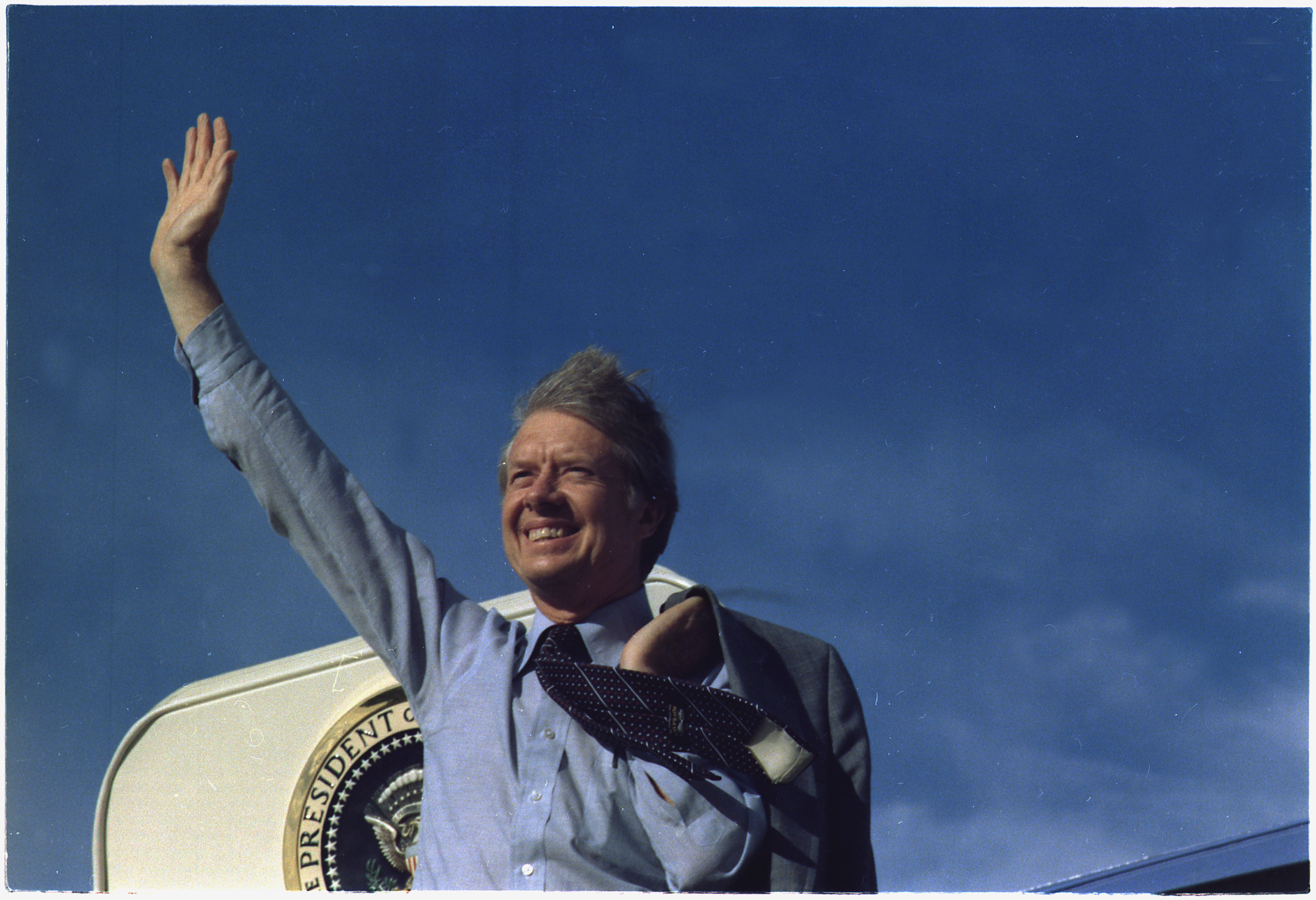
Jimmy Carter waving from Air Force One, 17 May 1977

- May 17 – President Carter announces the nomination of Richard K. Fox, Jr. for Ambassador Extraordinary and Plenipotentiary of the United States to the Republic of Trinidad and Tobago.
- May 17 – President Carter transmits Congress the governing international fishery agreement between the United States and Cuba in a message.
- May 17 – President Carter delivers an address at the United Auto Workers Convention to Yorty Hall at the Los Angeles Convention Center.
- May 17 – President Carter delivers an address at Fresno Airport on issues relating to California.
- May 18 – President Carter makes a joint appearance in the Rose Garden with Attorney General Bell and various representatives and senators the concerning foreign surveillance legislation.
- May 22 – President Carter delivers his Commencement at the University of Notre Dame in the History of Human Rights.
- May 24 – President Carter signs Executive Order 11993, amending the third section of Executive Order 11972.
- May 24 – President Carter issues a memorandum to executive department and agency leadership on the subject of the Advisory Committee Review.
- May 25 – President Carter attends the Democratic Congressional Dinner in the International Ballroom at the Washington Hilton Hotel.
- May 26 – President Carter holds his eighth news conference in Room 450 of the Old Executive Office Building. President Carter delivers an address on the administration's relations with Congress and answers questions on the SALT treaty negotiations, the termination of employment of General Singlaub, pending legislation, the Middle East, military installations, financial benefits of the presidency, foreign policy, welfare reform, and Menachem Begin.
- May 26 – President Carter announces the nomination of Thomas B.C. Leddy for Alternate U.S. Executive Director of the International Monetary Fund.
- May 26 – President Carter announces the nomination of John G. Heimann for Comptroller of the Currency.
- May 26 – President Carter announces the nomination of Marvin L. Warner for Ambassador Extraordinary and Plenipotentiary of the United States to Switzerland.
- May 26 – President Carter announces the nomination of Robert W. Scott for Federal Cochairman of the Appalachian Regional Commission.
- May 26 – President Carter signs Protocol l of the Treaty of Tlatelolco during an afternoon appearance in the Rose Garden.
- May 26 – President Carter signs H.R. 5562, establishing the Eleanor Roosevelt National Historic Site.
- May 26 – President Carter signs H.J. Res. 424 into law, allowing "the Administrator of General Services to accept on behalf of the people of the United States a generous gift of land, buildings, and equipment from the Commonwealth of Massachusetts for the John Fitzgerald Kennedy Library to be located in Boston." President Carter notes the signing is taking place on the sixtieth anniversary of John F. Kennedy's birth.
- May 27 – President Carter issues a statement on the International Labour Organization where he says the questions of its relations with the United States is "a matter of high priority and will remain under continuing review by a Cabinet-level committee where, we hope, the AFL-CIO and the Chamber of Commerce will continue to play active roles."
- May 27 – President Carter delivers remarks and answers questions on the dock at Port Canaveral.
- May 30 – President Carter answers questions from reporters on Cuba and his "optimism and Brezhnev's pessimism on SALT" during an appearance at the Brunswick Golden Isles Glynco Jetport.
- May 31 – President Carter answers questions on First Lady Carter's trip to Jamaica, problems of the Plains Baptist Church, and Cuba while at the depot.

== June ==
- June 6 – President Carter addresses members of the Capitol Page School in the State Dining Room, answering questions on life in Washington and his relationships with both family members and those in Congress.
- June 6 – President Carter announces the nomination of Joseph C. Wheeler for Assistant Administrator of the Agency for International Development (Near East).
- June 6 – President Carter announces the nomination of Roland R. Mora for Deputy Assistant Secretary of Labor for Veterans' Employment.
- June 6 – President Carter submits the United States-United Kingdom Taxation Convention Message to the Senate.
- June 6 – President Carter announces the designation of Nelson Cruikshank for Chairman of the Federal Council on the Aging.
- June 6 – President Carter announces the nomination of Edward R. Fried for United States Executive Director of the International Bank for Reconstruction and Development.
- June 7 – President Carter announces the nomination of Azie T. Morton for Treasurer of the United States.
- June 11 – Majority Leader Robert C. Byrd says President Carter is demonstrating a lack of knowledge about how Congress work in his charges that special interest caused the House to vote to scuttle parts of the administration's energy plan.

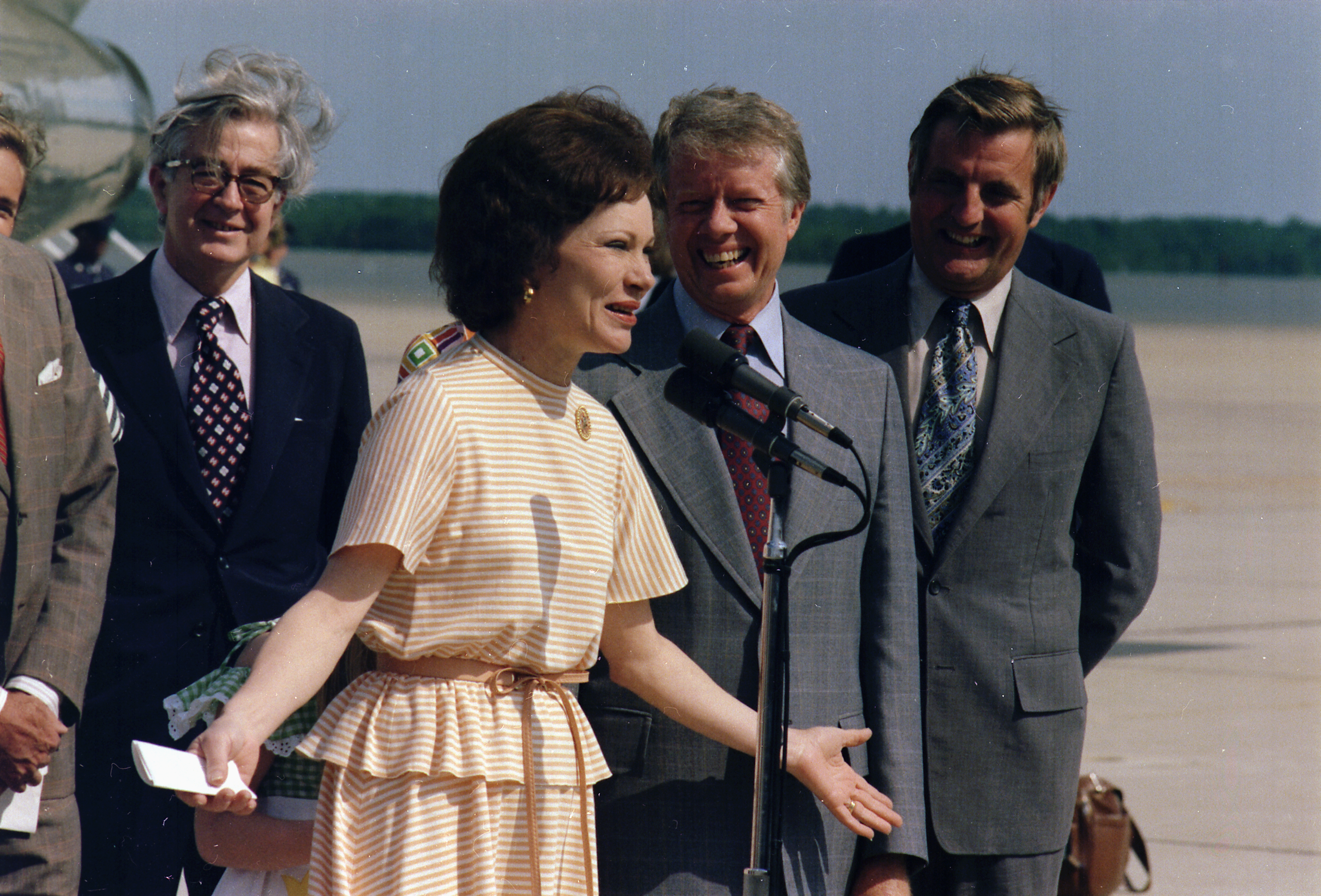
Rosalynn Carter, Jimmy Carter and Vice President Walter Mondale at a ceremony welcoming Mrs. Carter back from her Latin American trip, 12 June 1977

- June 12 – First Lady Carter addresses her trip to Latin America at Andrews Air Force Base. President Carter confirms the administration has "received a comprehensive report on Rosalynn's visit with the foreign ministers and with the heads of state" daily.
- June 13 – President Carter announces the nomination of Richard S. Page for Administrator of the Urban Mass Transportation Administration.
- June 13 – President Carter delivers a speech over the telephone to the Tucson, Arizona United States Conference of Mayors while in the Oval Office during the afternoon.
- June 13 – President Carter holds the ninth news conference of his presidency in Room 450 of the Old Executive Office Building during the afternoon.

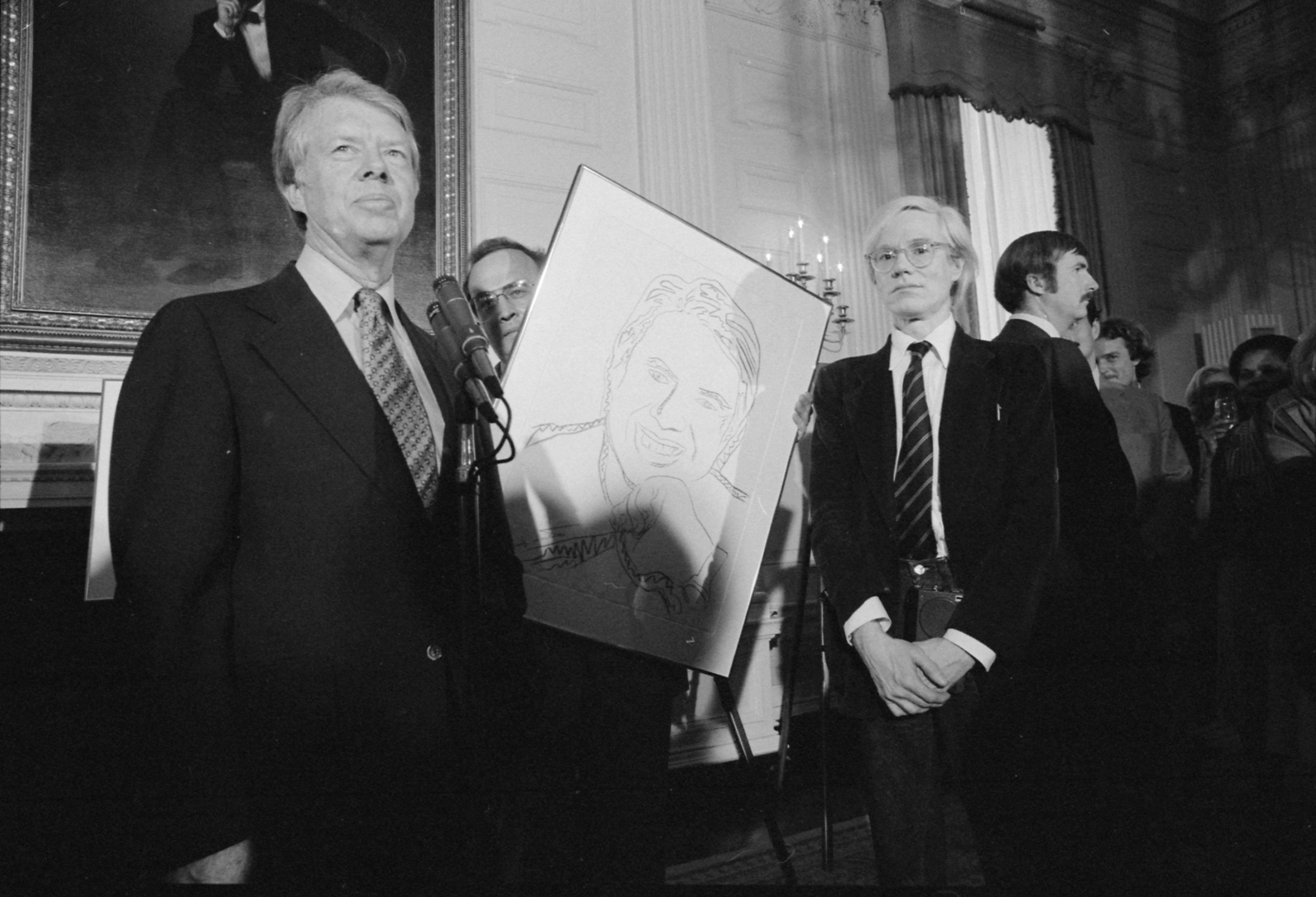
President Carter with Andy Warhol at a reception for inaugural portfolio artists, 14 June 1977

- June 14 – President Carter issues Executive Order 11996 in what he calls "a mark of respect to the memory of the Honorable Tom C. Clark". The U.S. and the Republic of China jointly sign an Orderly Marketing Agreement on shoe imports.
- June 21 – President Carter signs H.R. 6197 into law. President Carter says that while he favors the part of the legislation which extends the Disaster Relief Act, "the provisions which expand the Army Corps of Engineers' authority to provide emergency water supplies are subject to abuse and, to be effective, must be closely coordinated with the several drought programs already in operation."
- June 22 – President Carter announces the nomination of Blandina Cardenas for Chief of the Children's Bureau in the Department of Health, Education, and Welfare.
- June 22 – President Carter announces the nomination of Philip M. Kaiser for Ambassador Extraordinary and Plenipotentiary of the United States to Hungary.
- June 22 – President Carter addresses members of the Advertising Council, Inc. in the East Room. President Carter answers questions on the energy surplus, coal production, administration priories, and his views on the presidency.
- June 23 – President Carter announces the nomination of William E. Schaufele, Jr. for Ambassador Extraordinary and Plenipotentiary of the United States to Greece.
- June 27 – President Carter announces the nomination of Walter B. LaBerge for Under Secretary of the Army.
- June 27 – President Carter announces the nomination of Sar A. Levitan for membership on the National Commission on Employment and Unemployment Statistics.
- June 27 – President Carter announces the nomination of William Drayton, Jr. for Assistant Administrator of the Environmental Protection Agency (Planning and Management).
- June 27 – President Carter announces the appointment of Koryne Horbal for the Representative of the United States on the Commission on the Status of Women of the Economic and Social Council of the United Nations.
- June 27 – President Carter signs Executive Order 11998, establishing the President's Commission on Military Compensation.
- June 29 – President Carter issues a memorandum to department and agency leadership on the subject of a federal law enforcement review.
- June 30 – President Carter announces the nomination of Charles F. C. Ruff for Deputy Inspector General in the Department of Health, Education, and Welfare.
- June 30 – President Carter announces the nomination of Richard A. Frank for Administrator of the National Oceanic and Atmospheric Administration.
- June 30 – President Carter announces the nomination of W. Howard Wriggins for Ambassador Extraordinary and Plenipotentiary of the United States to the Republic of Sri Lanka and to the Republic of Maldives.
- June 30 – President Carter holds his tenth news conference in Room 450 of the Old Executive Office Building. President Carter begins the conference with an address on the Rockwell B-1 Lancer and answers questions from reporters on it as well as relations between the Soviet Union and the United States, the cruise missile capability of the US, the human rights policy of his administration, the Middle East, support from the Democratic Party, SALT negotiations, Panama Canal negotiations, OPEC oil prices, relations between the United States and China, his tax return, the American postal service, staff morals, and his presidential papers.
- June 30 – President Carter orders the halting of the B1 bomber program. He states that a strategic force that was both "effective and flexible" could be maintained without the B1.
- June 30 – The Carter administration proposes legislation allowing the Environmental Protection Agency to withhold some funding from sewage plants should cities fail to reduce their water usage by fifteen percent.

== July ==
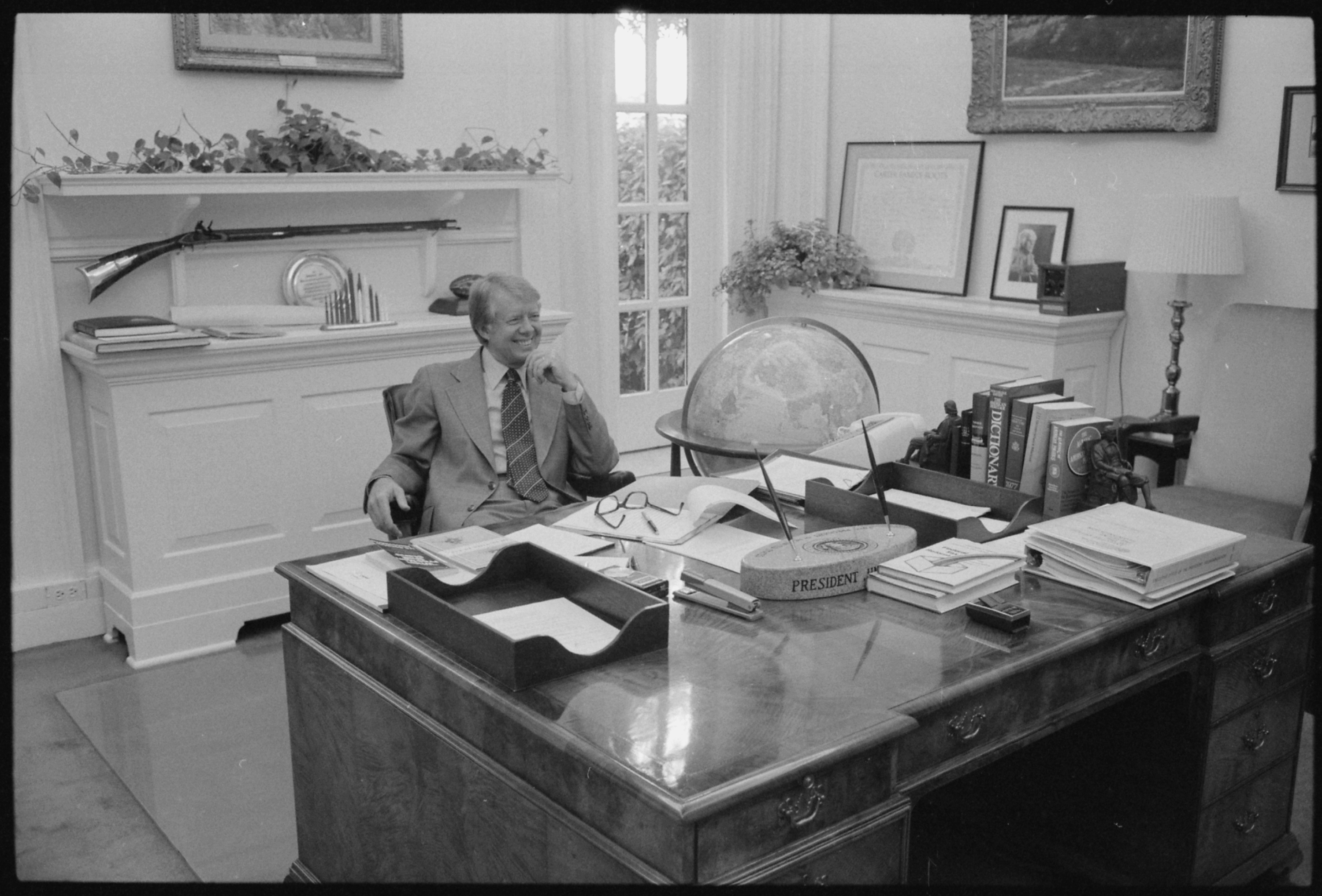
Jimmy Carter at his desk in his private study, 1 July 1977

- July 1 – President Carter announces the nomination of Louis A. Lerner for Ambassador Extraordinary and Plenipotentiary of the United States to Norway.
- July 1 – President Carter announces the nomination of Lawrence A. Pezzullo for Ambassador Extraordinary and Plenipotentiary of the United States to Uruguay.
- July 7 – President Carter announces the nomination of Elizabeth E. Bailey for membership on the Civil Aeronautics Board.
- July 8 – President Carter announces the nomination of David B. Bolen for Ambassador Extraordinary and Plenipotentiary of the United States to the German Democratic Republic.
- July 8 – President Carter announces the nomination of John R. Burke for Ambassador Extraordinary and Plenipotentiary of the United States to the Cooperative Republic of Guyana.
- July 8 – President Carter announces the nomination of Mauricio Solaun for Ambassador Extraordinary and Plenipotentiary of the United States to Nicaragua.
- July 8 – President Carter announces the nomination of Raymond L. Garthoff for Ambassador Extraordinary and Plenipotentiary of the United States to Bulgaria.
- July 8 – President Carter announces the nomination of Barry P. Bosworth for Director of the Council on Wage and Price Stability.
- July 8 – President Carter announces the nomination of John D. Negroponte for the rank of Ambassador during Negroponte's representation of the United States at international conferences and meetings on fish and wildlife matters.
- July 9 – President Carter attends a conference with a majority of US governors "on the subject of energy, the interrelationship between the Federal and State governments, and the major responsibilities that fall on the shoulders of Governors." President Carter and Florida Governor Reubin Askew hold a joint appearance in the Briefing Room discussing the contents of the meeting shortly afterward.
- July 11 – President Carter issues Proclamation 4512, designating the period of July 16 to July 24, 1977, as "United States Space Observance."
- July 11 – President Carter announces the nomination of Ray V. Fitzgerald for membership on the board of directors of the Commodity Credit Corporation.
- July 12 – President Carter announces the nomination of Jean M. Wilkowski for the rank of Ambassador during her tenure as coordinator of United States preparations for the United Nations Conference on Science and Technology for Development.
- July 12 – President Carter holds his eleventh news conference in Room 450 of the Old Executive Office Building. President Carter answers questions from reporters on arms and weapons, the minimum wage, atomic weapons, foreign eavesdropping on telephone conversations, stock market investments, relations between the United States and Soviet Union, the Middle East, abortion, relations with Congress, and the FBI Director nominees.
- July 12 – President Carter announces the nomination of Earl Oliver for membership on the Railroad Retirement Board.
- July 12 – President Carter announces the nomination of Forrest J. Gerard for Assistant Secretary of the Interior for Indian Affairs.
- July 12 – President Carter announces the designation of Joseph M. Henritie as Chairman of the Nuclear Regulatory Commission.
- July 12 – President Carter announces the nomination of Peter A. Bradford for membership on the Nuclear Regulatory Commission.
- July 15 – President Carter submits Reorganization Plan No. 1 of 1977 to Congress.
- July 26 – President Carter announces the nomination of Richard J. Daschbach for Commissioner of the Federal Maritime Commission.
- July 26 – President Carter issues a memorandum to department and agency leadership on affirmative action in the executive branch.
- July 27 – President Carter announces the designation of Lloyd N. Cutler as his special representative for maritime boundary and resource negotiations with Canada. Cutler is also given the personal rank of Ambassador.
- July 28 – President Carter holds his twelfth press conference in Room 450 of the Old Executive Office Building. Carter begins the conference by addressing nuclear test ban negotiations and financing for election campaigns before answering questions from reporters on Israel settlements, foreign arm sales, oil imports, the Middle East, Prime Minister Begin, his views on his presidency so far, welfare programs, discrimination, social programs, and the Federal Bureau of Investigation.
- July 28 – President Carter signs the International Navigational Rules Act of 1977 into law. The legislation implements the Convention on the International Regulations for Preventing Collisions at Sea for United States vessels. Carter notes his "serious constitutional reservations" with section 3(b), raising concern that it may be in violation of Article I, Section 7 of the U.S. Constitution.
- July 28 – President Carter announces the nomination of Robert C. Marshall for both membership and President of the Mississippi River Commission.
- July 28 – President Carter announces the nomination of Eloise A. Woods for Chairman of the National Credit Union Board.
- July 28 – President Carter announces the nomination of Marshall D. Shulman for the rank of Ambassador during his tenure as Special Adviser to the Secretary of State for Soviet Affairs.
- July 28 – President Carter announces the nomination of Lawrence Connell, Jr. for Administrator of the National Credit Union Administration.
- July 28 – President Carter announces the nomination of William P. Dixon for U.S. Alternate Executive Director of the International Bank for Reconstruction and Development.
- July 28 – The White House announces that President Carter will withdraw the sale notification of the AWACS to Iran and resubmit it when Congress reconvenes in September.
- July 28 – President Carter sends a letter to members of the Senate Committee on Commerce, Science, and Transportation urging a haste in passing a bill that would reduce regulation of the airline industry.
- July 29 – President Carter announces the appointment of Arthur C. Upton for Director of the National Cancer Institute, Department of Health, Education, and Welfare.
- July 29 – The Carter administration announces a survey directed toward congressional members to see which issues afflict the daily lives of their constituents, its results slated to "be used in pinpointing targets for President Carter's Government reorganization program."
- July 29 – President Carter announces the nominations of Charles B. Curtis and Georgiana Sheldon for membership on the Federal Power Commission.
- July 29 – President Carter issues Executive Order 12006, giving G. Joseph Minetti exemption from the mandatory requirement age as a result of what Carter terms "public interest".
- July 29 – President Carter delivers an address on current programs being undertaken by the administration including welfare reform and answers questions on Cuba, deregulation of natural gas and oil, oil location and production, energy conservation, government reorganization, inner cities, Israel settlements in occupied lands, power failure in New York, his openness with the American public, and the Russell Dam during an afternoon appearance in the Cabinet Room.

== August ==
- August 1 – In a statement, President Carter says H.R. 2502 will extend 17 Federal oil and gas leases in Wyoming for four years and its purpose "is to permit the lessees the additional time needed to drill an ultradeep well. Technological problems have prevented the lessees from drilling that well to date."
- August 1 – President Carter announces the nomination of Roberta S. Karmel for membership on the Securities and Exchange Commission.
- August 1 – President Carter announces that "a proposal for establishing the Agency for Consumer Protection entirely from existing resources was sent to Congress by Bert Lance".
- August 1 – President Carter issues a statement on the National Energy Plan, thanking various members of Congress for their involvement in advancing the plan and urging the House of Representatives "to retain the natural gas pricing program which I proposed and which has been adopted by the Commerce Committee and by the Ad Hoc Committee."
- August 2 – President Carter announces the nomination of Edward Marks for Ambassador Extraordinary and Plenipotentiary of the United States to the Republic of Guinea-Bissau and to the Republic of Cape Verde.
- August 2 – President Carter announces the nomination of Joseph D. Duffey for Chairman of the National Endowment for the Humanities.
- August 2 – President Carter delivers an address on his "sending Congress a message which expresses my strong concern about the crime and sickness and death caused by the abuse of drugs, including barbiturates and alcohol" in the Briefing Room. President Carter states the intent of the administration to deal with the influx of heroin on an international level.
- August 2 – In a message to Congress, President Carter details the effects of drugs internationally and his aim to discourage their use domestically, this being followed by an outline of his actions responding to the issue.
- August 2 – President Carter issues a memorandum to department and agency leadership stating his act of having directed the administration's "Reorganization Project staff at the Office of Management and Budget to review the organization of all Federal responsibilities for managing natural resources and protecting the environment."
- August 2 – President Carter announces the appointment of William M. Schreiber for Commissioner of the United States on the International Boundary Commission, United States and Canada.
- August 2 – President Carter issues a memorandum to the Assistant Secretaries of Labor, Occupational Safety and Health, the Administrator, Environmental Protection Agency, the chairman, Consumer Product Safety Commission, the Commissioner, Food and Drug Administration responding favorably to their July 27 letter describing steps the "four agencies are taking to develop a common, coordinated approach in regulating toxic and hazardous substances."
- August 3 – President Carter signs the Surface Mining Control and Reclamation Act of 1977 into law during a morning ceremony in the Rose Garden. President Carter states his discontent with parts of the legislation but expresses satisfaction with the leadership of Senator Henry Jackson and Congressman Mo Udall.
- August 3 – President Carter issues a statement on the death of Makarios III, referring to him as a great statesman who the US mourns the loss of.
- August 4 – President Carter signs the Department of Energy Organization Act and an amendment to the Small Business Administration Act in the signing ceremony of the Rose Garden.
- August 4 – President Carter announces the nomination of James R. Schlesinger for United States Secretary of Energy.
- August 4 – President Carter and President of Tanzania Julius Nyerere deliver remarks in the South Lawn. President Carter reflects on Nyerere's visit to the United States during the Presidency of John F. Kennedy.
- August 6 – President Carter announces the nomination of Frank Jones for assistant director for Legal Affairs and General Counsel of the Community Services Administration.
- August 6 – Secretary of State Vance says the US will have to amplify its abilities to be a mediating force in the event a peace conference on the Middle East is held during the remaining months of the year.
- August 6 – President Carter asks Congress to remove the welfare system and in its place implement a plan of 34 billion that requires able-bodied recipients to get jobs while providing money for those unable to work.
- August 8 – President Carter answers questions from reporters on developments in the Middle East and the prospects of a Geneva conference in October at the Carter Warehouse in Plains, Georgia.
- August 8 – President Carter signs the Clean Air Act Amendments of 1977 into law. President Carter says the legislation amends the Clean Air Act to direct the Environmental Protection Agency to form monetary penalties equal to the cost of cleanup.
- August 8 – President Carter signs H.R. 7553, a bill intended to reverse the authorization of deleted projects, continue close scrutiny of all projects, and institute lasting reforms in water policy.
- August 11 – President Carter announces the nomination of Robert C. Marshall for Federal Representative and non-voting Chairman of the Red River Compact Commission.
- August 11 – President Carter issues a memorandum to agency and department leadership on government reorganization, stating his commitment to accomplishing the endeavor "with a minimum of hardship to employees" and his actions pertaining to the goal.
- August 12 – President Carter delivers an address on Panama Canal negotiations in the Briefing Room. President Carter says the negotiations sought by his three immediate predecessors will be completed during his tenure and the treaty will bestow the US "operating control and the right to protect and defend the Panama Canal with our own military forces until the end of this century."
- August 12 – President Carter issues a memorandum to department and agency heads praising the services of the Combined Federal Campaign.

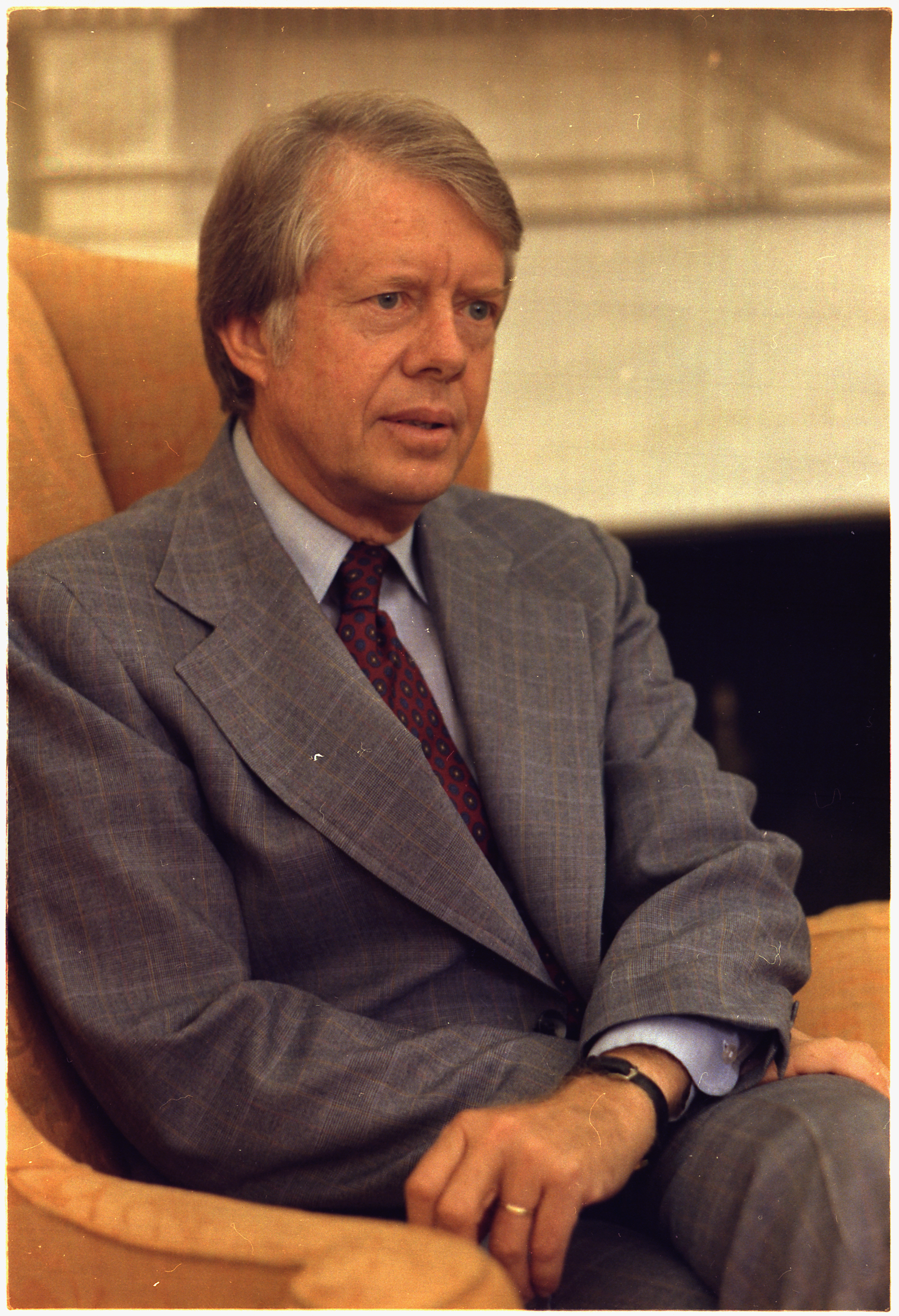
Jimmy Carter seated in the Oval Office, 15 August 1977

- August 15 – President Carter announces the designation of Daniel E. Leach as Vice Chairman of the Equal Employment Opportunity Commission.
- August 15 – President Carter announces the nomination of Maurice D. Bean for Ambassador Extraordinary and Plenipotentiary of the United States to the Socialist Republic of the Union of Burma.
- August 15 – President Carter announces the nomination of Mari-Luci Jaramillo for Ambassador Extraordinary and Plenipotentiary of the United States to Honduras.
- August 15 – President Carter announces the nomination of William B. Schwartz, Jr. for Ambassador Extraordinary and Plenipotentiary of the United States to the Commonwealth of the Bahamas.
- August 15 – President Carter announces the nomination of George C. Pimentel for deputy director of the National Science Foundation.
- August 15 – President Carter sends Congress the twenty-sixth annual report on the National Science Foundation in a message.
- August 15 – President Carter issues a statement on the observance of High Holy Days.
- August 15 – President Carter announces the addition of six individuals to the Advisory Commission on Intergovernmental Relations.
- August 16 – President Carter announces the appointment of Arthur I. Blaustein to membership in addition to being Chairman of the National Advisory Council on Economic Opportunity.
- August 16 – In a message to Congress, President Carter reports on the budget deferral of the Energy Research and Development Administration's Intense Neutron Source Facility.
- August 17 – President Carter releases a statement on the death of Elvis Presley who he recalls "burst upon the scene with an impact that was unprecedented and will probably never be equaled."
- August 17 – President Carter announces the nomination of Frank M. Johnson, Jr. for Director of the Federal Bureau of Investigation.
- August 18 – President Carter signs H.R. 6370 into law, an authorization of "FY 1978 appropriations of $11,522,000 for the International Trade Commission" and bestows the president the power to appoint a chairman to the six member commission beginning in June 1978.
- August 18 – President Carter signs H.R. 6179 into law, adding "a new section 37 to the Arms Control and Disarmament Act, declaring the sense of the Congress that adequate verification of compliance should be an indispensable part of any international arms control agreement."
- August 23 – President Carter holds his fourteenth news conference in Room 450 of the Old Executive Office Building, answering questions from reporters on the Panama Canal, Israel, and Bert Lance.
- August 25 – President Carter signs an executive order establishing the Presidential Management Intern Program during a morning signing ceremony in the Rose Garden. President Carter states the program will enlist 250 individuals of both genders for two years with the government and the likelihood of the program expanding in the future.
- August 25 – President Carter announces the nominations of individuals for Representative and Alternate Representatives of the United States to the 21st session of the General Conference of the International Atomic Energy Agency (IAEA.
- August 27 – President Carter sends a letter to President of the Atlantic Treaty Association Karl Mommer requesting a conference to reassess the state of their alliance.
- August 29 – President Carter issues Proclamation 4516 designating the week beginning on September 1, 1977, as "National Hispanic Heritage Week".
- August 30 – President Carter delivers an address on the progress of the Panama Canal Treaty during a briefing with officials in the State Dining Room.
- August 31 – President Carter issues a statement calling on Americans to comply with the 55 mile per hour speed limit, reporting on the drop in highway fatalities that have occurred since the lowered speed limit was imposed three years prior.
- August 31 – President Carter issues Proclamation 4518, a designation of "the week of September 18 through 24, 1977, as National Lupus Week and calling for its appropriate observance."
- August 31 – President Carter announces the nomination of Charles N. Van Doren for assistant director of the Arms Control and Disarmament Agency (ACDA).
- August 31 – President Carter announces the members of the Committee on Selection of Federal Judicial Officers.
- August 31 – President Carter announces the designation of Timothy F. Cleary for Chairman of the Occupational Safety and Health Review Commission.
- August 31 – President Carter announces the nomination of John B. Slaughter for assistant director of the National Science Foundation.

== September ==
- September 2 – President Carter announces the nomination of Thomas Garrett for Deputy U.S. Commissioner on the International Whaling Commission.
- September 2 – Government sources report the Carter administration is weighing having the Concorde supersonic airliner land in ten additional cities in spite of the controversy surrounding the aircraft's noise.
- September 3 – An administration source says President Carter is expected to announce major reforms on paperwork with the intent of easing the exasperation of state and local applicants as well as saving hundreds of millions of dollars.
- September 6 – President Carter announces the nomination of Frank J. Devine for Ambassador Extraordinary and Plenipotentiary of the United States to El Salvador.

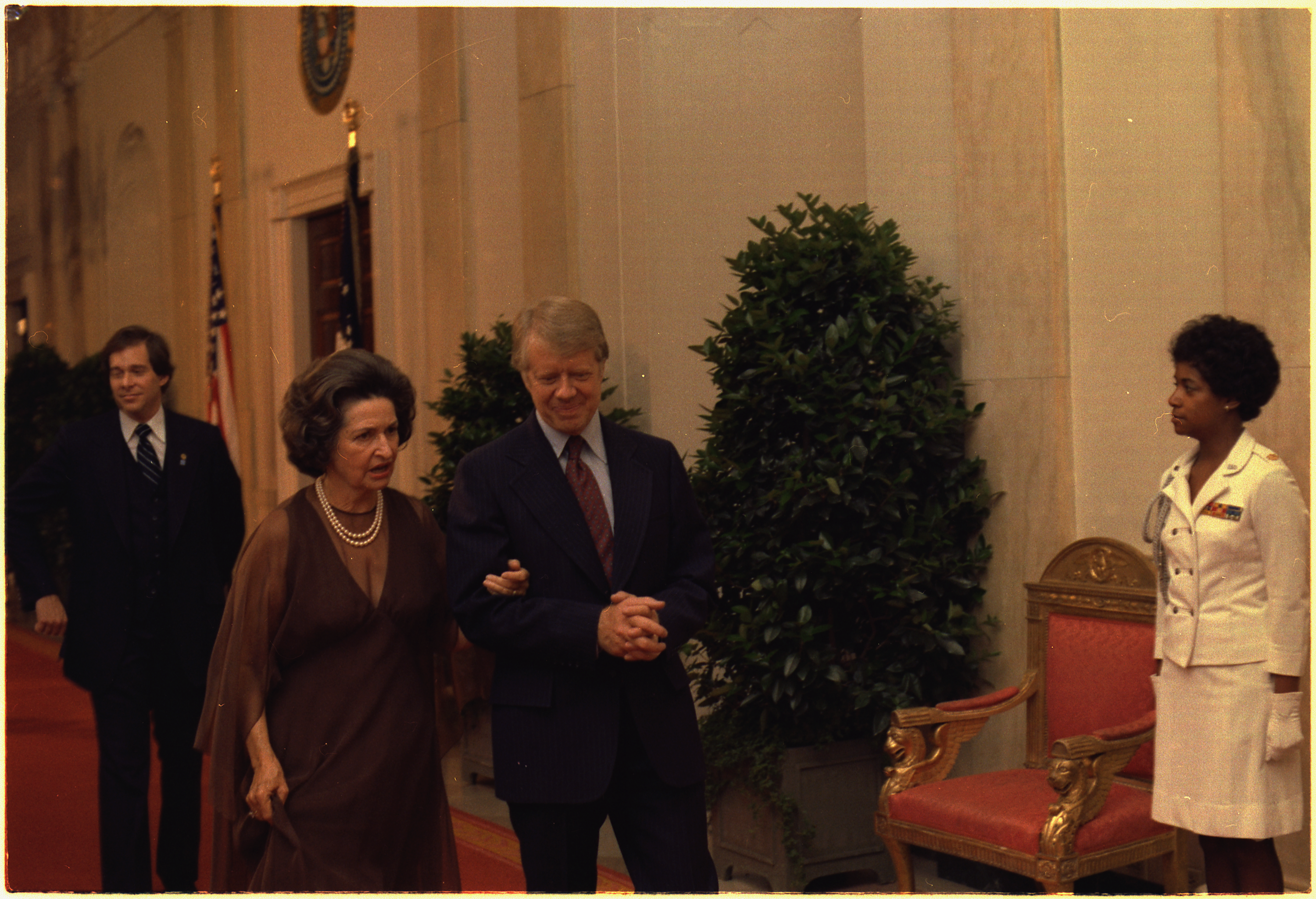
Jimmy Carter escorts Ladybird Johnson to the Panama Canal Treaty Dinner, 7 September 1977

- September 7 – President Carter announces the nomination of Esteban E. Torres for an Ambassador rank amid his assignment as U.S. Permanent Representative to the United Nations Educational, Scientific and Cultural Organization (UNESCO) in Paris.
- September 7 – President Carter announces the nomination of Carolyn R. Payton for associate director of ACTION.
- September 7 – President Carter announces the appointments of Douglas Fraser and Lloyd McBride for membership on the Advisory Committee for Trade Negotiations.
- September 7 – President Carter announces the nomination of Bertram R. Cottine for membership on the Occupational Health and Safety Review Commission.
- September 7 – President Carter announces the nomination of Arthur J. Goldberg for the position of Ambassador at Large and U.S. Representative to the Conference on Security and Cooperation in Europe (CSCE) and Chairman of the U.S. delegation to the CSCE.
- September 7 – President Carter announces the nomination of William E. Read for membership on the Mississippi River Commission.
- September 7 – The Torrijos–Carter Treaties are signed in the Hall of the Americas at the headquarters of the Organization of American States.
- September 7 – President Carter attends the Panama Canal Treaty Dinner in the State Dining Room.
- September 8 – President Carter and Prime Minister Pierre Trudeau issue a joint statement on the United States-Canada Agreement on a Natural Gas Pipeline.
- September 8 – President Carter and Prime Minister Trudeau make a joint appearance before reporters in the Briefing Room to announce the Natural Gas Pipeline.
- September 8 – President Carter addresses his meeting with President of Bolivia Hugo Suarez while speaking to reporters on the South Grounds.
- September 8 – President Carter announces the nomination of Donald M. O'Shei for membership on the California Debris Commission.
- September 10 – President Carter attends a rally at the corner of Butler and Hudson Streets in the Chambersburg area in Trenton, New Jersey.
- September 12 – In a statement, President Carter addresses minority business enterprise, stating his intent "to rely on the Interagency Council, chaired by Sidney Harman, the Under Secretary of Commerce, to promote, coordinate, and monitor Federal programs relating to minority business enterprise."
- September 12 – President Carter announces the nomination of Charles D. Ferris for membership on the Federal Communications Commission.
- September 12 – President Carter announces the according of David H. Popper for the personal rank of Ambassador during his tenure as deputy to Ambassador at Large Ellsworth Bunker for Panama Canal Treaty Affairs.
- September 13 – President Carter signs Executive Order 12009, designating October 1 as the start date for the Department of Energy.
- September 13 – President Carter issues Proclamation 4519, requesting Americans to observe October 24, 1977 as "Veterans Day".
- September 13 – President Carter announces the appointment of Elizabeth Miller for membership on the President's Cancer Panel.
- September 14 – President Carter announces the appointments of James E. Baker as Deputy Representative of the United States on the Economic and Social Council of the United Nations, and Ruth S. Morgenthau as Representative of the United States on the Commission for Social Development of that Council.
- September 14 – President Carter announces the nomination of George W. Landau for Ambassador Extraordinary and Plenipotentiary of the United States to Chile.
- September 14 – President Carter issues a memorandum to department and agency leadership on the subject of the Presidential Domestic Policy Review System.
- September 22 – President Carter announces the nomination of Robert R. Humphreys for Commissioner of the Rehabilitation Services Administration.
- September 23 – President Carter announces the nominations of Lynn R. Coleman for General Counsel of the Department of Energy, and Diego C. Asencio for Ambassador Extraordinary and Plenipotentiary of the United States to Colombia.
- September 23 – President Carter issues Proclamation 4524 designating October 9, 1977, as "Leif Erikson Day".
- September 28 – President Carter announces the nomination of Barry M. Blechman for assistant director of the U.S. Arms Control and Disarmament Agency.
- September 28 – President Carter announces the nomination of John J. Boyle for Public Printer.
- September 28 – President Carter announces the nomination of Don S. Smith for Commissioner of the Federal Energy Regulatory Commission.
- September 28 – President Carter issues a statement on the forthcoming Country Music Month. He reflects on his childhood of listening to the musical genre.
- September 28 – President Carter issues Executive Order 12010, an adjustment to the wages of employees in the government and military.
- September 29 – President Carter signs the Food and Agriculture Act of 1977 during a morning signing ceremony in the Rose Garden. President Carter calls the act "one of the most progressive and far-reaching pieces of legislation that has come before me."
- September 29 – President Carter sends a message to Congress "on the comparability adjustment I am ordering for the Federal statutory pay systems in October 1977." This is accompanied by a copy of the executive order he issued to implement the increase in pay rates.
- September 30 – In a 50 to 44 vote, the Senate rejects setting aside a plan for federal controls on gas prices to be lifted. This marks the second time that the Carter administration-backed gas proposal was defeated in the Senate.
- September 30 – The United States and Soviet Union reach a consensus to making an effort toward forming a Middle East peace conference before the year is over.
- September 30 – Through a meeting with Edvard Kardelj, President Carter receives a message from North Korea offering a meeting between American and North Korean officials.

== October ==
- October 3 – President Carter signs H.R. 6111 into law, a three-year extension of the Runaway Youth Act during a morning Rose Garden ceremony.
- October 3 – President Carter signs H.R. 1862 into law, providing "a 6.6 percent increase in compensation payments for over 2 million disabled veterans and their survivors."
- October 3 – President Carter announces the nominations of Sharon Percy Rockefeller and Gillian M. Sorensen for membership on the board of directors of the Corporation for Public Broadcasting.
- October 3 – President Carter announces the nominations for membership on the National Advisory Committee for Juvenile Justice and Delinquency Prevention.
- October 3 – President Carter sends a report to Congress on "42 deferrals of fiscal year J 978 funds totalling $1,480.6 million" in a message.
- October 3 – President Carter issues Executive Order 12012, an amendment of Executive Order 11183.
- October 4 – President Carter delivers a morning address to the United Nations in General Assembly Hall.
- October 4 – President Carter delivers an address to officials of the African nations at the headquarters of the U.S. Mission to the United Nations in New York City.
- October 4 – President Carter delivers an address to members of the American delegation and American officials of the United Nations Secretariat in the United Nations Building in New York City.
- October 4 – President Carter attends the working dinner for Western and Eastern European nations officials at the U.S. Mission headquarters to the United Nations in New York City.
- October 4 – President Carter sends a letter "on the status of refugees from Cambodia, Laos, and South Vietnam" to congressional chairmen.
- October 5 – In a joint statement, the U.S. and Israel state their agreement "that Security Council Resolutions 242 and 338 remain the agreed basis for the resumption of the Geneva Peace Conference and that all the understandings and agreements between them on this subject remain in force."
- October 5 – President Carter addresses reporters at the U.N. Plaza Hotel. He states that he has directed Housing and Urban Development Secretary Harris "to work closely with the Interior Department in putting down some plans along with the city and State for recreation areas and park areas in regions where buildings need to be destroyed."
- October 5 – President Carter releases a statement containing a list "of the new fiscal and economic assistance provided to New York this year".
- October 7 – President Carter delivers an address to the Democratic National Committee in the International Ballroom at the Washington Hilton Hotel.
- October 7 – President Carter announces the nomination of Theodore M. Hesburgh for the rank of Ambassador during his tenure as Chairman of the U.S. Delegation to the United Nations Conference on Science and Technology for Development.
- October 7 – President Carter announces the nomination of Donald E. Stingel for membership on the board of directors of the Export-Import Bank.
- October 7 – President Carter announces the nomination of Mortimer L. Downey III for Assistant Secretary of Transportation.
- October 7 – President Carter transmits a governing international fishery agreement between the United States and Mexico to Congress in a message.
- October 7 – President Carter sends the Senate the Reciprocal Fisheries Agreement between the Government of the United States of America and the Government of the United Kingdom of Great Britain and Northern Ireland for ratification.
- October 7 – President Carter signs Executive Order 12013, an amendment of Executive Orders 11541, 10253, 10033, and 11961 substituting the Secretary of Commerce with prior provisions of the orders.
- October 8 – President Carter signs S. 1307 into law. President Carter says the legislation will provide "standards for discharge review and benefit eligibility for those persons whose discharge is upgraded by the Department of Defense under the Special Discharge Review Program and for certain other veterans."
- October 8 – The White House announces membership of a three-member group to become involved with trying to solve the Maine Indian land dispute.
- October 11 – President Carter announces the nomination of Robert E. White for Ambassador Extraordinary and Plenipotentiary of the United States to Paraguay.
- October 11 – President Carter announces the appointments of Gerald V. Howard and Wymberly DeR. Coerr as Commissioners on the Inter-American Tropical Tuna Commission.
- October 11 – President Carter sends Congress the second Reorganization Plan of 1977 in a message.
- October 11 – President Carter sends Congress the tenth quarterly report of the Council on Wage and Price Stability in a message.
- October 11 – President Carter signs the Housing and Community Development Act of 1977 into law during a morning Rose Garden ceremony. President Carter says the legislation "takes a giant step forward and gives me and the administration, the lending institutions, private developers, local and State officials, a framework within which we can make great improvements in the housing of our people."
- October 12 – President Carter announces the nomination of Gerald L. Klerman for Administrator of the Alcohol, Drug Abuse, and Mental Health Administration.
- October 12 – President Carter announces the appointment of John E. Downs as Representative of the United States on the Council of the International Civil Aviation Organization.
- October 12 – President Carter announces the nomination of George A. Peapples for Assistant Secretary of the Navy.
- October 12 – President Carter announces his appointment of P. Michael Timpane as deputy director of the National Institute of Education.
- October 12 – President Carter announces the nominations of the individuals on the National Museum Services Board.
- October 13 – President Carter holds his seventeenth news conference in Room 450 of the Old Executive Office Building. President Carter begins with an address on the ongoing energy crisis which he says is going to be the most important domestic issue during his tenure and answers questions from reporters on Senate action regarding energy legislation, tax reform, reduction on oil consumption, relations with the Senate on energy, oil company divestiture, urban policy, Panama General Torrijos, the Humphrey-Hawkins bill, Panama Canal treaties, energy legislation, American steel industry, energy shortage, domestic policy proposals, and Robert H. Mendelsohn.
- October 13 – President Carter announces the nomination of Oliver S. Crosby for Ambassador Extraordinary and Plenipotentiary of the United States to the Republic of Guinea.
- October 13 – President Carter issues Proclamation 4532, a proclamation of December 15, 1977, as "National Day of Prayer."
- October 14 – President Carter announces the nomination of Tyrone Brown for membership on the Federal Communications Commission.
- October 21 – President Carter announces the nomination of Samuel D. Zagoria for membership on the Federal Election Commission.
- October 21 – President Carter announces the nomination of Audrey A. Kaslow for Commissioner of the U.S. Parole Commission.
- October 21 – President Carter signs S. 1372 into law. The legislation establishes the position of Under Secretary of Defense for Research and Engineering and announces the nomination of William J. Perry for the post.
- October 21 – President Carter attends a forum in the Ballroom at the Veterans Memorial Building in Detroit, Michigan. President Carter begins the conference with remarks on his own history with Detroit and the city's declining unemployment rate and answers questions on unemployment, migrant workers, neighborhood revitalization, senior citizens, youth unemployment, community action programs, Appalachian migrants, urban programs in Detroit, role of urban programs for women, job programs, senior citizens, utility assurance program, rising costs of energy, community action programs, special education programs, social service agencies, and citizen participation in community programs.
- October 21 – President Carter arrives at Des Moines International Airport in Des Moines, Iowa. President Carter delivers an address on domestic issues such the energy crisis and foreign policy such as exports and the threat of nuclear weapons.
- October 21 – President Carter attends the Democratic Party Jefferson-Jackson Day Dinner in Des Moines.
- October 27 – President Carter holds a news conference in Room 450 of the Old Executive Office Building during the afternoon.

== November ==
- November 1 – President Carter signs H.R. 3744 into law during a morning signing ceremony in the Rose Garden, establishing "a Minimum Wage Study Commission to make sure that in the future, when minimum wage legislation is considered, that the overall impact will be beneficial, that the direct effect on the inflation rate, possible unemployment, will be very carefully considered and that we won't play the drop-far-behind/ catchup game in the future." President Carter notes the Fair Labor Standards Act of 1938 signed by President Franklin D. Roosevelt and that Jennings Randolph was present for that signing as well as this one.
- November 1 – President Carter submits the thirty-first annual report on the principal activities of the United States in the United Nations and its constituent organizations during 1976 to Congress.
- November 1 – President Carter states that he has directed the US to withdraw from its membership with the International Labour Organization as a result of the ILO not changing in compliance with the conditions stipulated by the United States two years prior.
- November 1 – President Carter submits a message to Congress transmitting the amendments to Reorganization Plan No. 2 of 1977.
- November 2 – President Carter announces the nomination of John A. Hewitt, Jr. for Assistant Secretary of the Air Force.
- November 2 – President Carter is presented with the Nahum Goldmann Medal at the Capital Hilton Hotel. President Carter delivers an address on the contributions of the World Jewish Congress as well as its origins.
- November 3 – President Carter transmits the annual World Weather Plan describing "significant activities and accomplishments and outlines the planned participation of Federal agencies for the coming fiscal year" to Congress in a message.

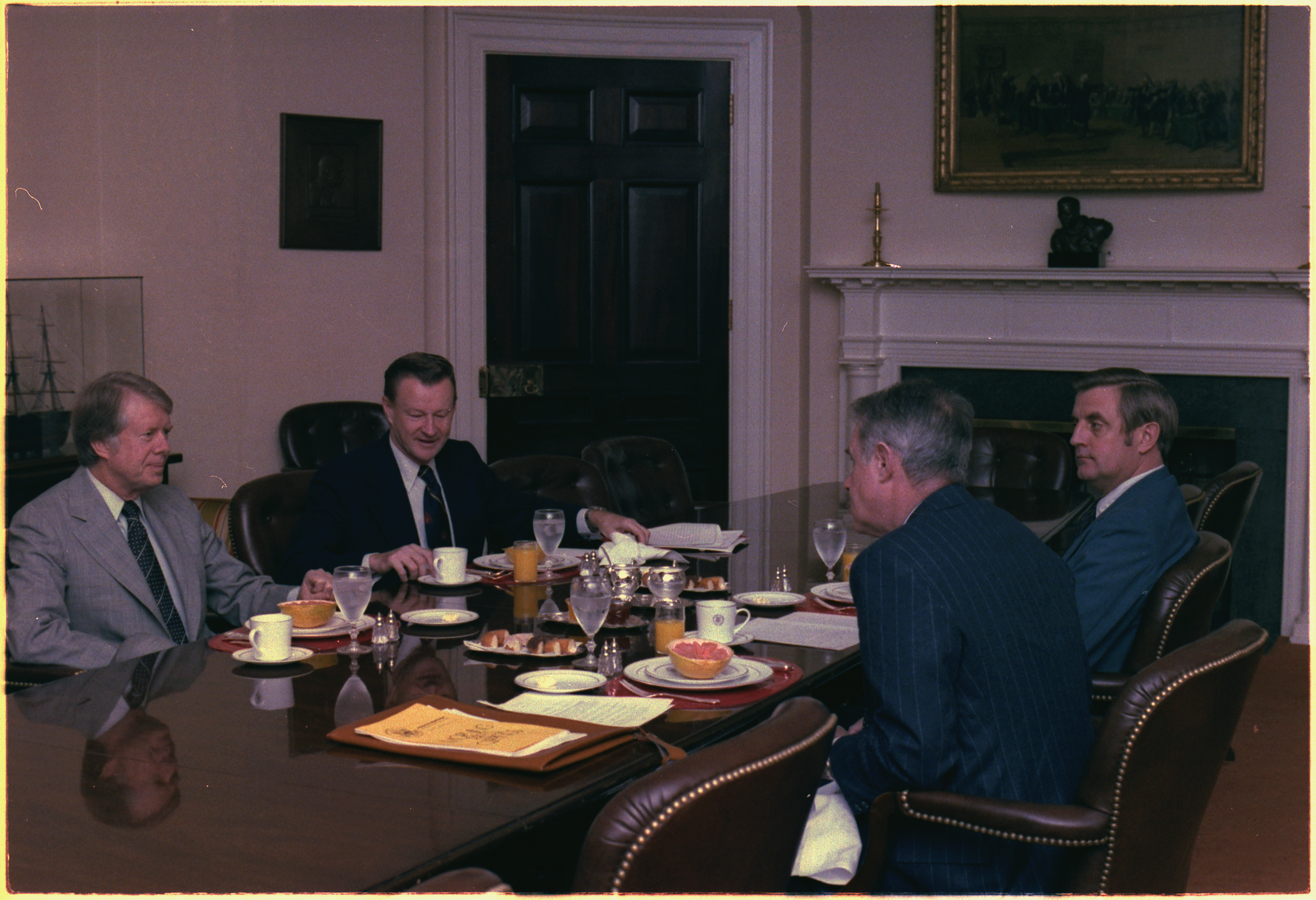
Breakfast meeting with Jimmy Carter, Zbigniew Brzezinski, Walter Mondale and Cyrus Vance, 4 November 1977

- November 4 – President Carter signs H.R. 2817 and H.R. 4297 into law during a morning ceremony in the Indian Treaty Room of the Old Executive Office Building. H.R. 2817 authorizes both the expansion and completion of the Tinicum National Environmental Center while H.R. 4297 regulates the dumping of municipal and other wastes into the oceans.
- November 4 – President Carter announces the appointments of seven individuals to the Strategy Council.
- November 4 – President Carter transmits a report "concerning the extent to which the Republic of Korea is cooperating with the Department of Justice investigation into allegations of improper activity in the United States by agents of the Republic of Korea."
- November 5 – President Carter vetoes the Department of Energy Authorization Act of 1978—Civilian Applications. President Carter charges the bill with creating an unnecessarily expensive project through the mandate funding for the Clinch River Breeder Reactor Demonstration Plant that "would be technically obsolete and economically unsound", and imposing limitations on the Department of Energy and himself.
- November 5 – President Carter issues Proclamation 4535, a designation of the week starting on November 6 as "Emergency Medical Services Week".
- November 7 – President Carter announces the nomination of William M. Isaac for membership on the board of directors of the Federal Deposit Insurance Corporation.
- November 7 – President Carter announces the nomination of Stephen J. Gage for Assistant Administrator of the Environmental Protection Agency (EPA).
- November 7 – President Carter announces the nomination of Thibaut de Saint Phalle for membership on the board of directors of the Export-Import Bank of the United States.
- November 7 – President Carter attends a meeting of the Strategy Council in the Cabinet Room. President Carter addresses changes in statistics as it relates to drugs.
- November 8 – President Carter announces the nomination of David T. Schneider for Ambassador Extraordinary and Plenipotentiary of the United States to the People's Republic of Bangladesh.
- November 8 – President Carter announces the nomination of Thomas J. Corcoran for Ambassador Extraordinary and Plenipotentiary of the United States to the Republic of Burundi.
- November 8 – President Carter signs H.J. Res. 621 into law during an afternoon signing ceremony in the Cabinet Room. The joint resolution approves the construction of a natural gas pipeline from Alaska through Canada and is said by President Carter to be "a very important demonstration of our Nation's commitment to provide adequate energy supplies in the future, to protect the quality of the environment in our two nations, to work harmoniously in one of the most complicated and most expensive engineering projects ever undertaken by human beings."
- November 8 – President Carter delivers an evening address from the Oval Office on the energy crisis. His remarks primarily cover the National Energy Plan as well as proposals on the part of Congress and the effects the crisis is having on the US.

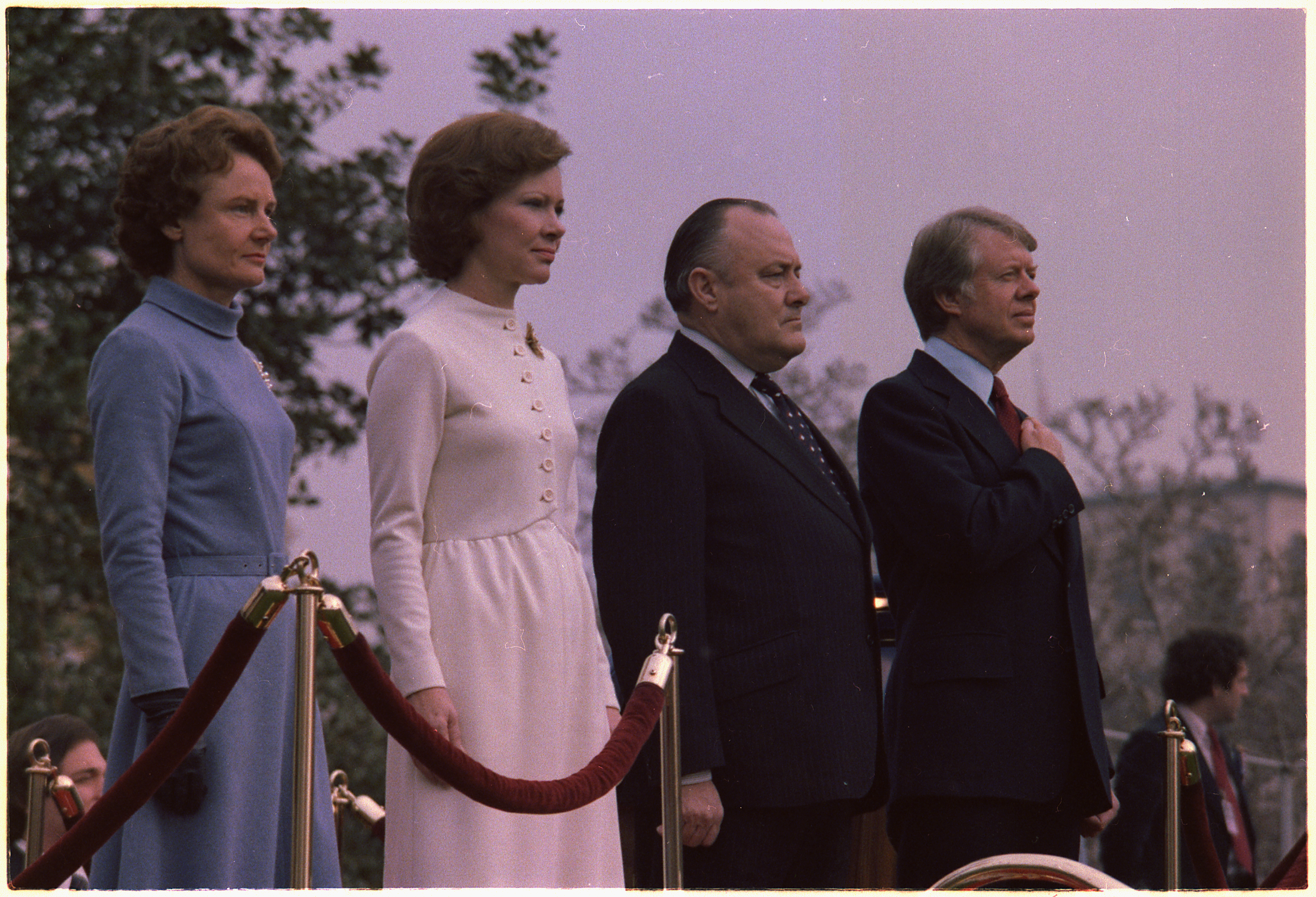
Thea Muldoon, Rosalynn Carter, New Zealand Prime Minister Robert Muldoon and Jimmy Carter during at welcoming ceremony for the Prime Minister, 9 November 1977

- November 10 – President Carter holds a news conference, the nineteenth of his presidency, in Room 450 of the Old Executive Office Building during the morning.
- November 10 – President Carter announces the nomination of Ernest Ambler for Director of the National Bureau of Standards.
- November 14 – President Carter announces the appointments of Theodore Bikel, Maureen Dees, and Jacob Lawrence for membership on the National Council on the Arts.
- November 14 – President Carter announces the nominations of Rita E. Hauser and Frank Markoe, Jr. for membership on the Board for International Broadcasting.
- November 14 – The White House announces the appointment of Rita Elway for membership on the National Commission on the Observance of International Women's Year.
- November 20 – President Carter answers questions from reporters on the Middle East including opposition by the Syrians.
- November 22 – President Carter attends the presentation ceremony for the National Medal of Science in Room 450 of the Old Executive Office Building.
- November 23 – President Carter announces the nomination of Lincoln E. Moses for Administrator of the Energy Information Administration.
- November 28 – President Carter issues a statement on the death of Senator John L. McClellan and praises him as someone who "persistently spoke out for a strong national defense and upheld integrity in the operations of Government."
- November 30 – President Carter holds a televised and radio broadcast news conference in Room 450 of the Old Executive Office Building during the morning. President Carter signs Executive Order 12021 into law, effectively amending the civil service rules for the exemption of some positions within career service.

== December ==
- December 1 – President Carter announces his choice to nominate George S. McIsaac for United States Assistant Secretary of Energy.
- December 2 – President Carter delivers a speech honoring Senator Hubert Humphrey in the International Ballroom at the Washington Hilton Hotel during the evening.
- December 3 – President Carter meets with Prime Minister of Morocco Ahmed Osman for the delivery by Osman of a message from King Hassan during the morning.
- December 5 – President Carter issues Executive Order 12026, reinstating rights to certain employees within the Energy Department. President Carter announces his nomination of William P. Adams for membership on the Railroad Retirement Board.
- December 6 – President Carter announces his nomination of Benjamin R. Civiletti for United States Deputy Attorney General.
- December 9 – President Carter signs H.J. Res. 662 into law. President Carter says the legislation "incorporates the FY 1978 appropriations for the Department of Labor, the Department of Health, Education, and Welfare, the Community Services Administration, and other agencies."
- December 9 – President Carter holds an afternoon interview with news directors and editors.
- December 12 – The White House announces Interior Secretary Cecil D. Andrus will chair a Cabinet-level study of non-fuel minerals policy. President Carter announces the appointment of Cecila D. Esquer, Steven L. Engelberg, Hillary Rodham, Richard A. Trudell, and Josephine Worthy for membership on the board of directors of the Legal Services Corporation.
- December 13 – President Carter signs the Rural Health Clinic Services bill into law.
- December 14 – President Carter announces his nomination of Alvin H. Gandal for Commissioner of the Postal Rate Commission.
- December 15 – President Carter holds his twenty-first news conference in Room 450 of the Old Executive Office Building. President Carter begins the conference with delivering remarks on international human rights practices and answers questions from reporters on the Middle East, legislative accomplishments, Social Security legislation, the Soviet Union, policies on agriculture, his foreign travel, and tax reduction.
- December 17 – President Carter participates in a morning interview with Jeff Thompson from the Fayetteville, North Carolina home of his sister Ruth Carter.
- December 19 – President Carter announces the appointment of fifteen individuals for membership on the National Commission on Neighborhoods.
- December 20 – President Carter delivers an address on amendments to the Social Security Act while in the Indian Treaty Room at the Old Executive Office Building during the morning. President Carter signs S. 305, amending the Social Security Act, Carter noting the provisions fulfill his campaign promises.
- December 21 – President Carter signs Executive Order 12031 into law, exempting Jerome K. Kuykendall "from mandatory retirement until September 30, 1978."
- December 22 – President Carter announces the nomination of Richard J. Bloomfield for United States Ambassador to Portugal.
- December 24 – President Carter issues a message celebrating the holiday season.
- December 25 – President Carter speaks with reporters at the home of his uncle Alton Carter on Christmas Day during the afternoon.
- December 26 – President Carter speaks to reporters and answers questions at Warner Robins Air Force Base during the morning.
- December 28 – President Carter sits down with four television interviewers for a discussion in the White House reflecting on his first year in office and the contents of his Europe trip.
- December 28 – President Carter signs the Clean Water Act of 1977, amending the Federal Water Pollution Control Act of 1972, into law.
- December 29–31 – President Carter visits Poland at the invitation of the Polish People's Republic's highest authorities.
- December 29 – President Carter delivers a short address on what his objectives will be in the next nine days on a foreign trip while in the South Lawn of the White House during the morning.

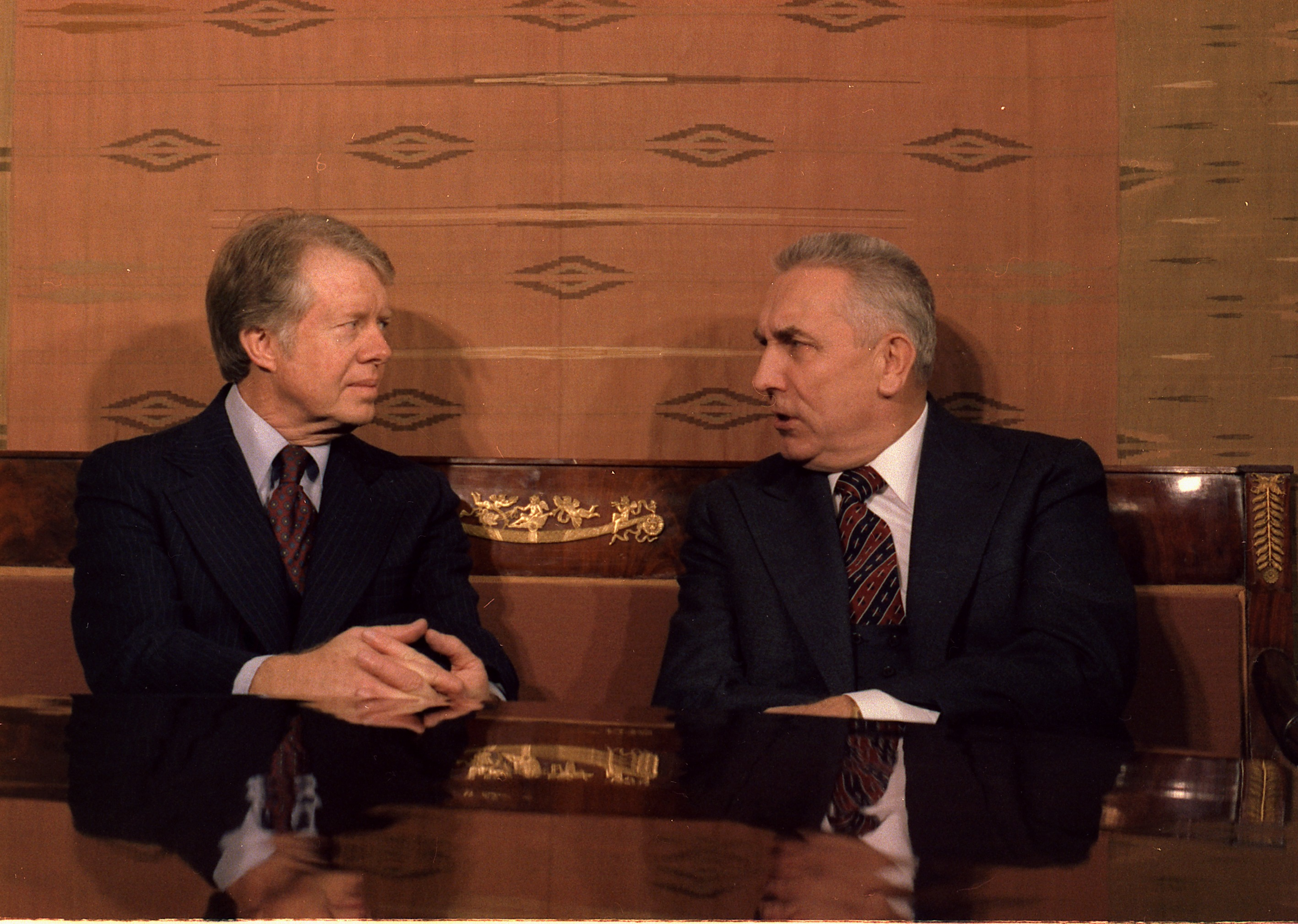
Jimmy Carter and First Secretary of Poland Edward Gierek, 30 December 1977

- December 30 – President Carter holds a news conference in the Grand Ballroom at the Victoria Hotel in Warsaw, Poland during the evening.

== See also ==
- Timeline of the Jimmy Carter presidency, for an index of the Carter presidency timeline articles

U.S. presidential administration timelines
Preceded by Ford presidency (1976–1977)	Carter presidency (1977)	Succeeded by Carter presidency (1978)
