= Inauguration of Jimmy Carter =

48th United States presidential inauguration

Presidential inauguration of Jimmy Carter
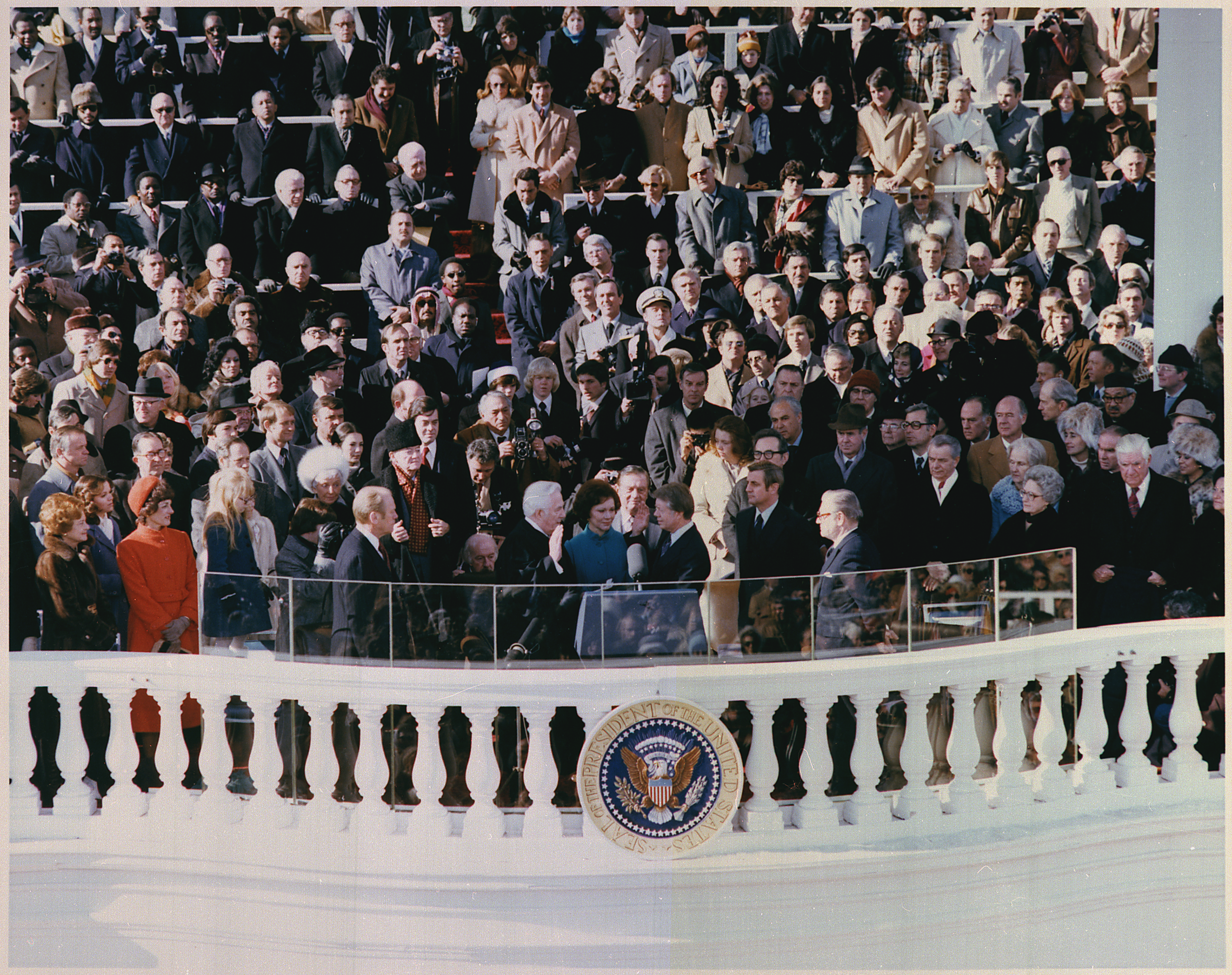
- Jimmy Carter takes the oath of office as the 39th president of the United States
- Date: January 20, 1977; 49 years ago
- Location: United States Capitol, Washington, D.C.
- Organized by: Joint Congressional Committee on Inaugural Ceremonies
- Participants: Jimmy Carter; 39th president of the United States — Assuming office Warren E. Burger; Chief Justice of the United States — Administering oath Walter Mondale; 42nd vice president of the United States — Assuming office Tip O'Neill; Speaker of the United States House of Representatives — Administering oath

The inauguration of Jimmy Carter as the 39th president of the United States was held on Thursday, January 20, 1977, at the East Portico of the United States Capitol in Washington D.C. This was the 48th inauguration and marked the commencement of the only term of both Carter as president and Walter Mondale as vice president. Chief Justice Warren E. Burger administered the presidential oath of office to Carter, and Speaker of the House Tip O'Neill administered the vice presidential oath of office to Mondale. This was the last inauguration held on the East Portico of the Capitol building as well as the last time the chief justice would stand to the left of the podium, with the audience facing them, while swearing in a president. Exactly forty years later, Carter attended the first inauguration of Donald Trump, becoming the first U.S. president to mark the 40th anniversary of his inauguration.

== Inaugural ceremonies ==
Carter took the Oath with a Family Bible, opened to Micah 6:8 and also the same Bible used by George Washington at his 1789 inauguration. The Bible that originally belonged to Washington was at the time in the possession of St. John's Mason Lodge No. 1. The weather was cold, but sunny, with a wind chill factor in the teens. The estimated noon time temperature was at around 28 °F (−2 °C), but the cold did not stop many excited spectators from catching a glimpse of the new president being sworn into office. Carter took the oath of office using his nickname "Jimmy", instead of his actual name James Earl; he was the first president to use a nickname in any official capacity, and the only to use it during his swearing in. (Note: Bill Clinton, who served as the 42nd president from 1993 to 2001, often used the nickname "Bill", but tended to sign documents as "William J." and was sworn in using his full name "William Jefferson".)

Carter's inaugural address was 1,228 words long. In it, he spoke of bringing "a new spirit among us all", and urged Americans to "reject the prospect of failure or mediocrity". He also expressed his desire that someday "the nations of the world might say that we had built a lasting peace, built not on weapons of war but on international policies which reflect our own most precious values".

Benedictions were given by Catholic archbishop John Roach and Methodist bishop William Ragsdale Cannon.

Following the swearing-in ceremony, Carter became the first president to walk from the Capitol to the White House in the post-ceremony parade. Carter also requested that the traditional Inaugural luncheon, an event hosted by the Joint Congressional Inaugural Committee, be canceled. Coverage of the event was provided by CBS and the ceremony was televised throughout the United States.

The Carter Inauguration was the first following the opening of the Metro system and, in part because the inaugural committee paid to make the system free all day, it set a single day ridership record of 68,023 riders, a record that would last until the system was expanded the following July.

== Music ==
Songs performed at Carter's inauguration included Willie Nelson's "Crazy," sung by Linda Ronstadt; Irving Berlin's "God Bless America," sung by Aretha Franklin; "Take Care of This House" from the Broadway musical 1600 Pennsylvania Avenue by Leonard Bernstein and Alan Jay Lerner, performed by Frederica von Stade and the National Symphony Orchestra; and "Bess, You Is My Woman Now" from George Gershwin's Porgy and Bess (lyrics by DuBose Heyward), sung by Donnie Ray Albert and Clamma Dale. Additionally, America the Beautiful was performed by the United States Marine Band, and the Battle Hymn of the Republic was sung by selected voices from Atlanta University, Clark, Morehouse, Morris Brown, and Spelman Colleges, and the Interdenominational Theological Center. The national anthem was performed by Cantor Isaac Goodfriend of Atlanta, a Holocaust survivor.

== See also ==
- Presidential transition of Jimmy Carter
- Timeline of the Jimmy Carter presidency (1977)
- 1976 United States presidential election
- Jimmy Carter 1976 presidential campaign
