= Superdelegate =

Unpledged delegate to a presidential nominating convention

In American politics, a superdelegate is a delegate to a presidential nominating convention who is seated automatically.

In Democratic National Conventions, superdelegates—described in formal party rules as the party leaders and elected official (PLEO) category—make up slightly under 15% of all convention delegates. Before 2018, Democratic superdelegates were free to support any candidate for the presidential nomination in all rounds of balloting. (This contrasts with pledged delegates, who were selected based on the party presidential primaries and caucuses in each U.S. state, in which voters choose among candidates for the party's presidential nomination.) In 2018, the Democratic National Committee reduced the influence of superdelegates by barring them from voting on the first ballot at the Democratic National Convention, allowing them to vote only in a contested convention. In 2024, the Democratic National Committee voted to adopt new rules that allowed superdelegates to vote during the signature collection and on the first ballot of a virtual roll call for the presidential nomination, even without a candidate securing a majority of the convention's delegates using only pledged delegates, which were earned by the candidate during the primary process.

In Republican National Conventions, three Republican Party leaders of each state, territory, and Washington D.C. are automatically seated as delegates, but they are pledged to vote according to the results of their party branch's presidential primaries at least on the first ballot.

== In Democratic National Conventions ==
=== Description of superdelegates ===
Of all the delegates to the Democratic National Convention, slightly under 15% are superdelegates. According to the Pew Research Center, superdelegates are "the embodiment of the institutional Democratic Party – everyone from former presidents, congressional leaders and big-money fundraisers to mayors, labor leaders and longtime local party functionaries." Democratic superdelegates are formally described (in Rule 9.A) as automatic (or unpledged) party leader and elected official (PLEO) delegates; each falls into one or more of the following categories based on other positions they hold:

1. Elected members of the Democratic National Committee. Elected DNC members include "the chairs and vice chairs of each state and territorial Democratic Party; 212 national committeemen and committeewomen elected to represent their states; top officials of the DNC itself and several of its auxiliary groups (such as the Democratic Attorneys General Association, the National Federation of Democratic Women and the Young Democrats of America); and 75 at-large members who are nominated by the party chairman and chosen by the full DNC." Most at-large DNC members "are local party leaders, officeholders and donors or representatives of important Democratic constituencies, such as organized labor." At the 2016 Democratic National Convention, there were 437 DNC members (with 433 votes) who were superdelegates.
2. Democratic governors (including territorial governors and the mayor of the District of Columbia). There were 21 Democratic governors who were superdelegates at the 2016 Democratic National Convention.
3. Democratic members of Congress. There were 191 U.S. representatives (including non-voting delegates from Washington, D.C., and territories) and 47 U.S. senators (including Washington, D.C., shadow senators) who were superdelegates at the 2016 Democratic National Convention.
4. Any sitting Democratic president or vice president, if applicable.
5. Distinguished party leaders: consisting of all former Democratic presidents, vice presidents, congressional leaders (Democratic speakers of the U.S. House of Representatives, Democratic minority leaders of the House, and Democratic leaders of the Senate, and DNC chairs). There were 20 of these who were superdelegates at the 2016 Democratic National Convention.

Because the number of superdelegates depends on the number of Democratic members of Congress and Democratic governors, the exact number of superdelegates may change during the primary season (ahead of the convention) due to officials' deaths, resignations, or special elections.

Not all superdelegates attend the convention. For example, during his time in Congress, Democratic U.S. representative Jim Matheson skipped every convention. Former vice president Al Gore skipped the 2016 convention.

==== State residency ====
Under party rules, automatic delegates shall "legally reside in their respective state and ... shall be recognized as part of their state's delegation" (Rule 9.E). For example, in the 2008 convention, former Maine governor Kenneth M. Curtis was a superdelegate (by virtue of his position as a past DNC chair), but because he had moved to Florida in 2006, he was counted as part of the Florida delegation, not the Maine delegation.

==== Loss of superdelegate status ====
Additionally, under party rules, automatic delegates are automatically disqualified if they have "publicly expressed support for the election of, or has endorsed, a presidential candidate of another political party" (Rule 9.E) and no delegate "shall participate or vote in the nominating process for a Democratic presidential candidate who also participates in the nominating processes of any other party for the corresponding elections" (Rule 2.E). Thus, a person who would otherwise qualify as a superdelegate loses his or her superdelegate status by endorsing another party's presidential candidate. In 2008, Senator Joe Lieberman of Connecticut endorsed Republican John McCain, which, according to the chairwoman of the Connecticut Democratic Party, resulted in his disqualification as a superdelegate. Lieberman's status had, however, previously been questioned because, although he was a registered Democratic voter and caucused with the Democrats, he won re-election as the candidate of the Connecticut for Lieberman Party and was listed as an "Independent Democrat" on the ballot. Lieberman did not attend the Democratic Convention; he was instead a speaker at the Republican Convention.

==== Comparison with pledged delegates ====
The remaining 85% of delegates are pledged to a candidate and chosen in primaries and caucuses. Unlike the Republican primary process (in which many states have a "winner-take-all" process, awarding all or most votes to the candidate who wins a plurality of the vote), Democrats follow a proportionality rule. All candidates who received at least 15% of the vote are awarded delegates in proportion to their share of the vote. Most pledged delegates are allotted based on candidates' proportions of the vote at the district level (these generally correspond to congressional districts, but in some states correspond to state senate districts or specially designated "delegate districts"). Additional delegates (the "at-large" delegates) are awarded to candidates based on statewide results. Finally, there are pledged "party leader and elected official" (PLEO) delegates. These are large city mayors, state legislative leaders, and county party officials who are pledged to a certain candidate; like the statewide at-large delegates, pledged PLEO delegates are allocated proportionally to presidential candidates based on the statewide primary or caucus vote. The district, at-large, and PLEO delegates collectively constitute a state or territory's pledged delegation.

Unlike superdelegates, who may support a candidate of their choice, pledged delegates generally must support the candidate to whom they are pledged. Since 1982, the party rules have stated that: "Delegates elected to the national convention pledged to a presidential candidate shall in all good conscience reflect the sentiments of those who elected them."

If a candidate who has earned pledged delegates drops out before the national convention, then that candidate's delegates who were elected at the district level are released from their obligation to the dropped-out candidate. Pledged delegates who are allocated at the district level to a candidate who subsequently drops out of the race become "free agents": they often support the candidate whom the dropped-out candidate endorses, but are not obligated to do so. By contrast, statewide pledged delegates are usually proportionally reallocated to candidates still in the race at the time when the states formally elect their delegates: this typically takes place at a statewide convention held after the primary or caucus, but before the national convention in mid-summer.

By contrast, many superdelegates choose to announce endorsements, but they are not bound to those preferences, and may support any candidate they wish, including a candidate who has dropped out of the presidential race.

=== History ===
==== Origins ====
In the aftermath of the chaotic 1968 Democratic National Convention, the Democratic Party sought to shift the balance of power in the selection of the party's presidential candidate to primary elections and caucuses, mandating that all delegates be chosen via mechanisms open to all party members; these rules were implemented following the recommendations of the McGovern-Fraser Commission. This increased grassroots control of Democratic conventions. However, after Democratic nominee George McGovern lost in a landslide to Richard Nixon in 1972, and after a decisive fight over the rules at the 1980 convention between supporters of Jimmy Carter and supporters of Edward M. Kennedy, followed by Carter's defeat by Ronald Reagan in 1980, the party changed its nominating rules again.

A commission headed by North Carolina governor Jim Hunt issued a report in 1982, on a 47–6 vote, to set aside 550 unpledged delegate seats held by party officials, to vote alongside the 3,300 Democratic pledged votes. This partial reversal of the trend toward grassroots control was supported by mainstream party leaders in Congress, as well as organized labor. It increases the power of the institutional party "regulars" against insurgent "outsider" maverick candidates. Their initial proposal to have superdelegates represent 30% of all delegates to the national convention was defeated in favor of a compromise proposal by Geraldine A. Ferraro, in which superdelegates made up about 14% of delegates. The proportion of superdelegates eventually expanded over time, reaching about 20% at the 2008 convention.

==== 1984 and 1988 ====
In 1984, only state party chairs and vice chairs were guaranteed superdelegate status. The remaining spots were divided two ways. Democratic members of Congress were allowed to select up to 60% of their members to fill some of these spots. The remaining positions were left to the state parties to fill with priority given to governors and big-city mayors, led by Democrats and based on population. In the 1984 election, the major contenders for the presidential nomination were Gary Hart, Jesse Jackson, and Walter Mondale. Entering the final handful of primaries on June 5, Mondale was leading Hart in the delegate count, with Jackson far behind. The battle for delegates became more dramatic that night when Hart won three primaries, including the big prize of California in a cliffhanger. The Mondale campaign said, and some news reports agreed, that Mondale secured the needed 1,967 delegates to clinch the nomination that night in spite of losing California. But the Associated Press concluded he was "barely short of the magic majority." Mondale wanted to make it indisputable that he had enough delegate votes, and his campaign set a deadline of one minute before noon; he made 50 calls in three hours to nail down an additional 40 superdelegates and declared at a press conference that he had 2,008 delegate votes. At the convention in July, Mondale won on the first ballot.

In 1988, this process was simplified. Democrats in Congress were now allowed to select up to 80% of their members. All Democratic National Committee members and all Democratic governors were given superdelegate status. This year also saw the addition of the distinguished party leader category (although former DNC chairs were not added to this category until 1996, and former House and Senate minority leaders were not added until 2000). In 1992 was the addition of a category of unpledged "add-ons", a fixed number of spots allocated to the states, intended for other party leaders and elected officials not already covered by the previous categories. Finally, beginning in 1996, all Democratic members of Congress were given superdelegate status. The superdelegates have not always prevailed, however. Howard Dean took an early lead in delegate counts before the first primaries in the 2004 Democratic presidential primaries, but was later defeated by John Kerry, who won a succession of primaries and caucuses and, ultimately, the nomination. In 1988, a study found that delegates selected through the primary and caucus process were not substantively different from superdelegates in terms of issue viewpoints. However, superdelegates are more likely to prefer candidates with Washington experience than outsider candidates.

==== 2008 election ====
At the 2008 Democratic National Convention, the superdelegates made up approximately one-fifth of the total number of delegates. The closeness of the race between the leading contenders, Hillary Clinton and Barack Obama, led to speculation that the superdelegates would play a decisive role in selecting the nominee, a prospect that caused unease among some Democratic Party leaders. Obama led in pledged delegates at the end of voting in the state contests while not winning enough to secure the nomination without the superdelegates. In May 2008, however, Obama took the lead in superdelegate endorsements for the first time; Clinton dropped out four days after Obama clinched the nomination.

Pledged delegates from state caucuses and primaries eventually numbered 3,573, casting 3,566 votes, resulting in a total number of delegate votes of 4,419. A candidate needed a majority of that total, or 2,209, to win the nomination. Superdelegates accounted for 19.6% of convention delegates, while delegates chosen in the Democratic caucuses and primaries accounted for approximately four-fifths (80.4%) of the Democratic convention delegates. At the convention, Obama won 3,188.5 delegate votes and Clinton won 1,010.5 with 1 abstention and 218 delegates not voting.

==== 2016 election ====
In 2016, attention was raised to the role of superdelegates during the campaign between former secretary of state Hillary Rodham Clinton and U.S. senator Bernie Sanders for the Democratic nomination; Sanders' campaigns and his supporters initially criticized the role of superdelegates, the majority of whom favored Clinton. Several mainstream media outlets included superdelegates in the candidate delegate totals during the primary elections although superdelegates do not vote until the convention and may change their minds on whom they are planning to vote for anytime before the convention. The DNC asked media outlets to not include superdelegate pledges in delegate totals, but many outlets, including the Associated Press, NBC, CBS, and Politico, continued to report total pledged delegates, lumping together superdelegates and pledged delegates. Sanders supporters objected to this practice, argued that it inflated Clinton's lead and discouraged Sanders supporters.

Sanders initially said that the candidate with the majority of pledged delegates should be the nominee; in May 2016, after falling behind in the elected delegate count, he shifted, pushed for a contested convention and arguing that, "The responsibility that superdelegates have is to decide what is best for this country and what is best for the Democratic Party." Ultimately, Clinton won the nomination without relying on the votes of superdelegates; she led Sanders by a substantial number of elected delegates (from primary and caucus votes), as well by a substantial margin in the popular vote. She became the presumptive nominee in early June 2016, after the California primary; at the time, Clinton had 1812 pledged delegates and 572 superdelegates, and Sanders had 1520 pledged delegates and 46 superdelegates. Sanders continued to campaign after the last Democratic primary, unsuccessfully seeking to persuade superdelegates to switch their allegiance to him; ultimately, he conceded the race and endorsed Clinton on July 12, 2016.

==== Reform of superdelegates ====
===== DNC Unity Reform Commission (2016–17) =====
On July 23, 2016, ahead of the 2016 Democratic National Convention, the 2016 DNC Rules Committee voted overwhelmingly (158–6) to adopt a superdelegate reform package. The new rules were the result of a compromise between the Hillary Clinton and the Bernie Sanders presidential campaigns; in the past, Sanders had pressed for the complete elimination of superdelegates.

Under the reform package, a 21-member unity commission, chaired by Clinton supporter Jennifer O'Malley Dillon and vice-chaired by Sanders supporter Larry Cohen, was appointed after the 2016 general election. The commission's recommendations would be voted on at the next Democratic National Committee meeting, well before the beginning of the 2020 Democratic primaries. The commission was to consider "a mix of Clinton and Sanders ideas": expanding the ability of eligible voters to participate in caucuses (an idea supported by Clinton) and expanding the ability of unaffiliated or new voters to join the Democratic Party and vote in Democratic primaries via same-day registration and re-registration (an idea supported by Sanders). The commission drew comparisons to the McGovern–Fraser Commission, which established party primary reforms before the 1972 Democratic National Convention.

By April 2017, the complete commission had been appointed. In accordance with the compromise agreement, the 21 members include, in addition to O'Malley Dillon and Cohen; nine members selected by Clinton, seven selected by Sanders, and three selected by the DNC chair (Tom Perez). By May 2017, the DNC Unity Reform Commission had begun to meet to begin drafting reforms, including superdelegate reform as well as primary calendar and caucus reform.

The commission met in the summer and fall of 2017. Different proposals on superdelegates were considered by the party. One proposal was to bind all or some superdelegates to the results of state primaries and caucuses. Whether to abolish superdelegates altogether remained controversial within the party. In December 2017, the Unity Commission's recommendations were delivered to the DNC Rules and Bylaws Committee. Perez and Deputy DNC chair Keith Ellison co-authored an op-ed for CNN, announcing that the party would make a "significant" cut in the number of superdelegates who vote to decide on the presidential nominee.

===== Adoption of superdelegate reform (2018) =====
Ultimately, the DNC decided to prevent superdelegates from voting on the first ballot, instead of reducing their numbers. On August 25, 2018, the DNC approved a plan to reduce the influence of superdelegates by barring them from voting on the first ballot at the Democratic National Convention, allowing them to vote only in a contested convention (i.e., if a Democratic National Convention did not choose the nominee on the first ballot, because no candidate received an absolute majority [more than 50%] of the pledged delegates elected from the outcome of primaries and caucuses). This does not preclude superdelegates from publicly endorsing a candidate of their choosing before the convention.

The plan, which was endorsed by DNC chair Tom Perez, former DNC chair Howard Dean, and other party leaders, passed by an overwhelming margin; the New York Times noted that the compromise was a "rare mind meld between the Democratic establishment and progressive activists who have often chided the party's elite." The only dissenter on the DNC Rules Committee was former DNC chairman Donald L. Fowler, who argued that the existing system worked.

==== 2020 election ====
The first Democratic presidential primaries cycle under the new 2016–2018 superdelegate reform measures took place in 2020.

==== 2024 election ====
The Democratic National Committee held a virtual nomination vote in the first week of August 2024 to select its nominee for president. The virtual nomination rules allowed superdelegates to vote for a presidential candidate during the first ballot of the virtual roll call, as Joe Biden, who secured virtually all pledged delegates earned during the primaries, later withdrew from the 2024 election.

=== Criticism and defenses ===
The votes of superdelegates have never actually determined the Democratic nominee, although in 1984 they may have helped Walter Mondale win on the first ballot at the convention. (Note: The 1984 Democratic Party presidential primaries ended with Walter Mondale winning a plurality of delegates, leading the Senator Gary Hart in the count of elected delegates, with Jesse Jackson far behind. It was unclear whether Mondale had secured the absolute majority of 1,967 delegates to clinch the nomination, despite Hart's victory in California. Some press reports suggested that Mondale had clinched the nomination, but the Associated Press reported that he was "barely short of" a majority. Mondale made dozens of phone calls to superdelegates, securing the pledges of 40 of them, thus placing his status as the presumptive nominee beyond doubt. Experts differ on whether superdelegates were "decisive" to Mondale's nomination on the first ballot at the 1984 Democratic National Convention.)

==== Critics ====
Critics have assailed superdelegates' role in Democratic National Conventions both before and after the 2017 reforms. Susan Estrich argued in 2008 that superdelegates have more power than other delegates because of their greater freedom to vote as they wish beginning with the first ballot. (Superdelegates' ability to vote on the first ballot was eliminated after the 2017 reform.) U.S. senator Tim Kaine, Hillary Clinton's former running mate, said in 2017 that he agreed with Bernie Sanders that superdelegates should be eliminated from the process: "I have long believed there should be no superdelegates. These positions are given undue influence in the popular nominating contest and make the process less democratic." Prominent Democratic strategists Bob Shrum and Bill Carrick have also opposed superdelegates, and called for them to be dropped from the nominating process.

The role of superdelegates in the nominating process has also been criticized as unrepresentative. In 2007, Politico found that about half of the superdelegates were white men, compared to 28% of the Democratic primary electorate. Of the superdelegates at the 2016 convention, 58% were male and 62% were non-Hispanic white (20% were black and 11% were Hispanic). The average age was about 60. There is no bar on lobbyists serving as DNC members (and thus superdelegates); ABC News found that about 9% of superdelegates at the 2016 Democratic National Convention (67 people in all) were former or current lobbyists registered on the federal and state level.

==== Defenders ====
Author Jonathan Rauch and political scientist Ray La Raja argued in 2019 that the U.S. has given too much power to primary voters, and that this inflicts harms to democracy. They argue that "the role of superdelegates in the Democratic nomination process could be strengthened instead of weakened" and that this form of early vetting was positive, suggesting that this formal form of the "invisible primary" can be a positive force to counter-balance populism "by restoring the Madisonian pillars of pluralism, checks on power, and deliberative institutions."

In February 2016, U.S. representative Debbie Wasserman Schultz, chair of the Democratic National Committee, defended the role of superdelegates in an interview with Jake Tapper, arguing that unpledged delegates ensure "that party leaders and elected officials don't have to be in a position where they are running against grass-roots activists" and minimizes competition between the two groups.

== In Republican National Conventions ==
In the Republican Party, as in the Democratic Party, members of the party's national committee automatically become delegates. There are three Republican National Committee delegates (the national committeeman, national committeewoman, and party chair) for each state, territory, and Washington, D.C.. (Note: Although the term superdelegate was originally coined to describe a type of Democratic delegate, the term has become widely used to describe these delegates in both parties.)

At the 2012 Republican National Convention, convention rules were amended to obligate unpledged RNC members (the "superdelegates") to vote according to the result of the primaries held in their states. Pledged delegates selected by Republican primaries are assigned either on a proportional or a "winner-take-all" basis.

However, if a candidate does not win the party's nomination on the first ballot (i.e., by securing a majority—more than 50%), then some delegates become "unbound" free agents, depending on rules specific to state parties. For most states, delegates are "unbound" as soon as a first ballot concludes without a nominee being selected; for other states (including Texas) delegates are not unbound until a second ballot also fails to produce a majority for a candidate; and delegates from some other states (including Kansas and Alabama) remain bound to their candidate until the candidate releases them. These rules apply to both pledged delegates and superdelegates, meaning that superdelegates would play a role in selecting the nominee at a contested convention.

Superdelegates make up about 7% of all delegates to Republican national conventions. In the 2008 Republican National Convention, 123 RNC delegates among the 2,380 total delegates were not pledged to any candidate. In the 2016 Republican National Convention, 168 delegates among the 2,472 total delegates were "super" (unbound).

== See also ==
- List of superdelegates at the 2008 Democratic National Convention
- List of superdelegates at the 2016 Democratic National Convention
- List of automatic delegates at the 2020 Democratic National Convention
