= 1984 Democratic National Convention =

U.S. political event held in San Francisco, California

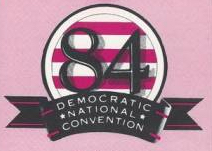
- 1984 presidential election

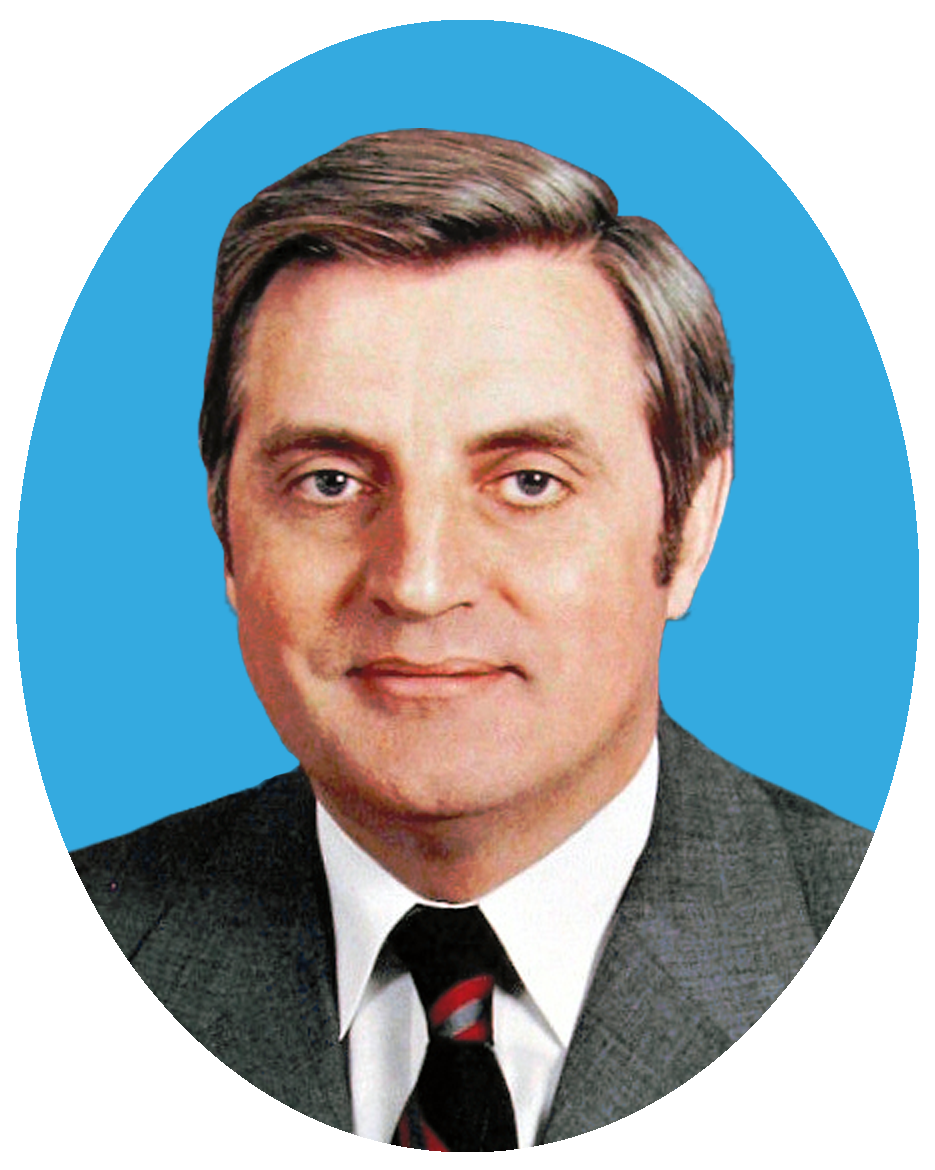
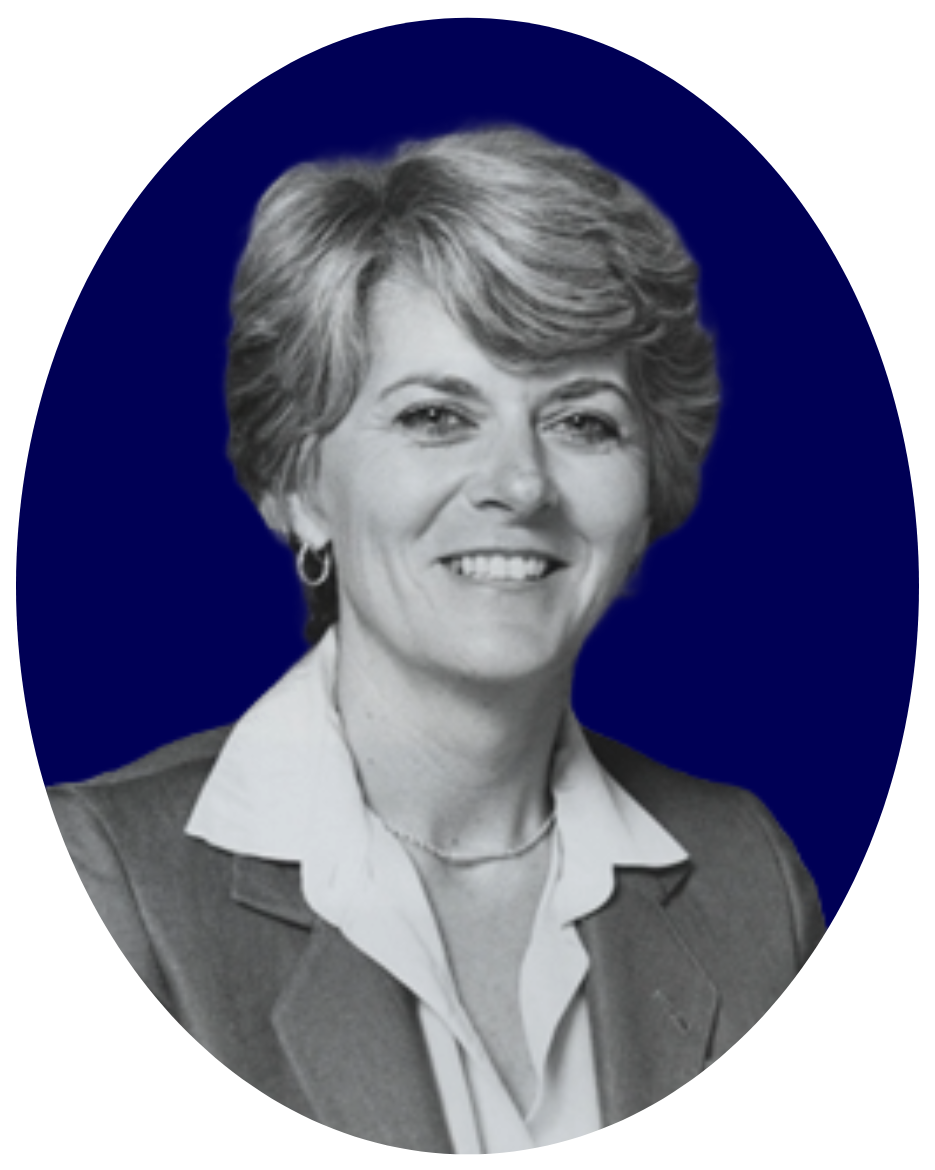
- Nominees; Mondale and Ferraro

Convention
- Dates: July 16–19, 1984
- City: San Francisco, California
- Venue: Moscone Center
- Keynote speaker: Mario Cuomo

Candidates
- Presidential nominee: Walter Mondale of Minnesota
- Vice-presidential nominee: Geraldine Ferraro of New York

Voting
- Total delegates: 3,884
- Votes needed for nomination: 1,967
- Results (president): Walter Mondale (Minnesota): 2,191 (56.41%); Gary Hart (Colorado): 1,201 (30.92%); Jesse Jackson (Illinois): 466 (12.00%); Others: 27 (0.67%)
- Ballots: 1

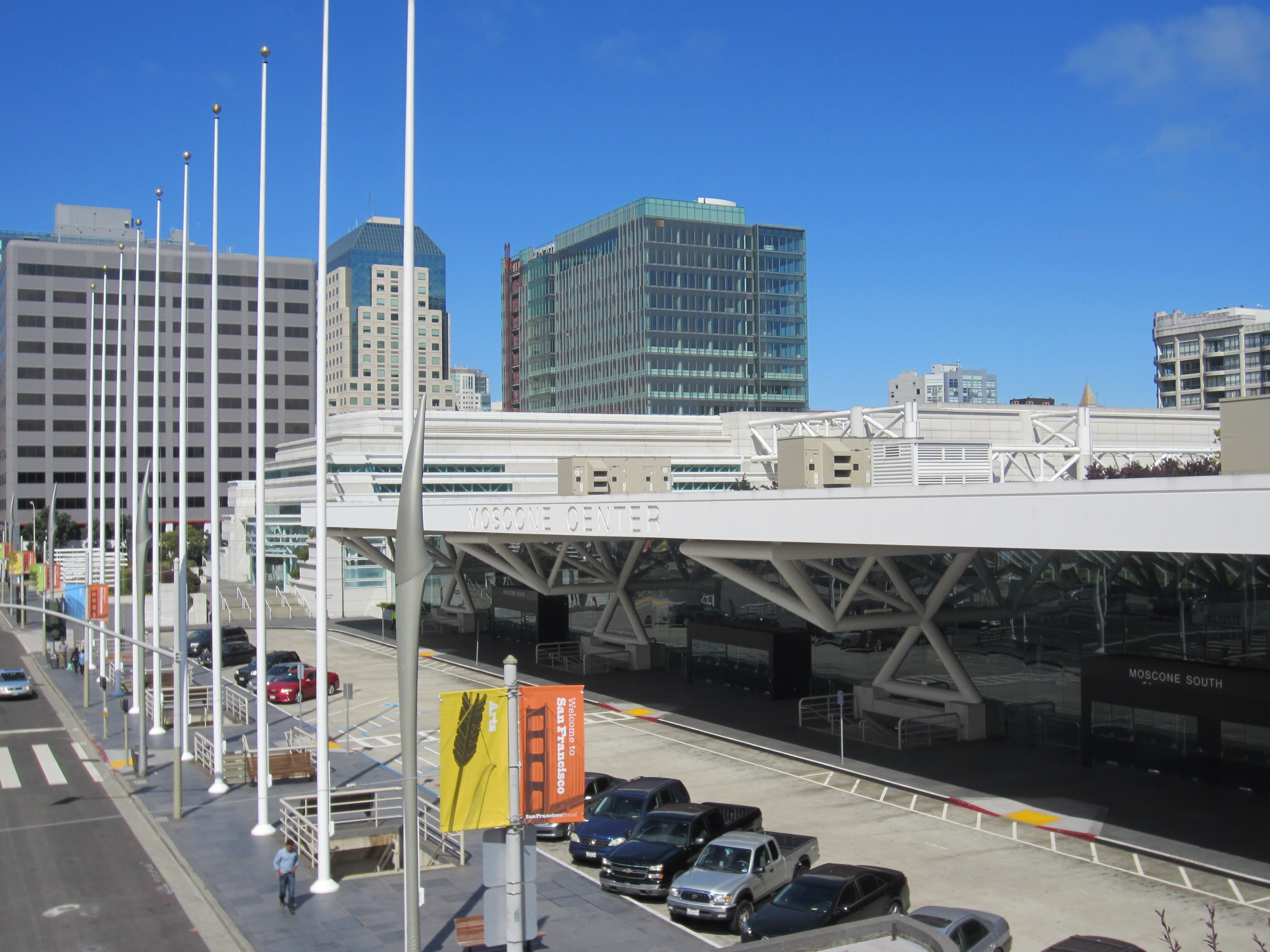
The Moscone Center was the site of the 1984 Democratic National Convention

The 1984 Democratic National Convention was held at the Moscone Center in San Francisco, California from July 16 to July 19, 1984, to select candidates for the 1984 United States presidential election. Former Vice President Walter Mondale was nominated for president and Representative Geraldine Ferraro of New York was nominated for vice president. Ferraro became the first woman to be nominated by either major party for the presidency or vice presidency. In another first, the 1984 Democratic Convention was chaired by the governor of Kentucky, Martha Layne Collins. The Democratic National Committee Chairman at the time, Charles T. Manatt, led the convention.

== Site selection ==
Finalist bid cities
City	Venue	Previous major party conventions hosted by city
Chicago, Illinois	McCormick Place	Democratic: 1864, 1884, 1892, 1896, 1932, 1940, 1944, 1952, 1956, 1968; Republican: 1860, 1868, 1880, 1884, 1888, 1904, 1908, 1912, 1916, 1920, 1932, 1944, 1952, 1960
Detroit, Michigan	Joe Louis Arena and Cobo Hall	Republican: 1980
New York City, New York	Madison Square Garden	Democratic: 1868, 1924, 1976, 1980
San Francisco, California	Moscone Center	Democratic: 1920; Republican: 1956,** 1964**
Washington, D.C.	Washington Convention Center	—N/a
**Conventions held in Daly City, California, a municipality adjacent to San Francisco

Preliminary bid cities (non-finalist)
City	Venue	Previous major party conventions hosted by city
Houston, Texas	Astrodome	Democratic: 1928
Kansas City, Missouri		Democratic: 1900; Republican: 1928, 1976
Miami Beach, Florida		Democratic: 1972; Republican: 1968, 1972
New Orleans, Louisiana	Louisiana Superdome	—N/a
Philadelphia, Pennsylvania		Democratic: 1936, 1948; Republican: 1856, 1872, 1900, 1940, 1948; Whig: 1848
Seattle, Washington	Kingdome	—N/a

== Logistics ==
The convention was the first to utilize the rule changes recommended by the Hunt Commission in response to the protracted 1980 Democratic Party presidential primaries between Jimmy Carter and Ted Kennedy, including the use of superdelegates.

The San Francisco Hilton served as the convention's headquarters hotel. It had previously been the headquarters hotel of the 1964 Republican National Convention.

Nancy Pelosi served as chair of the convention's host committee.

The convention cost in excess of $20 million to stage. $9 million was provided by the City of San Francisco's government itself.

== Events of the Convention ==
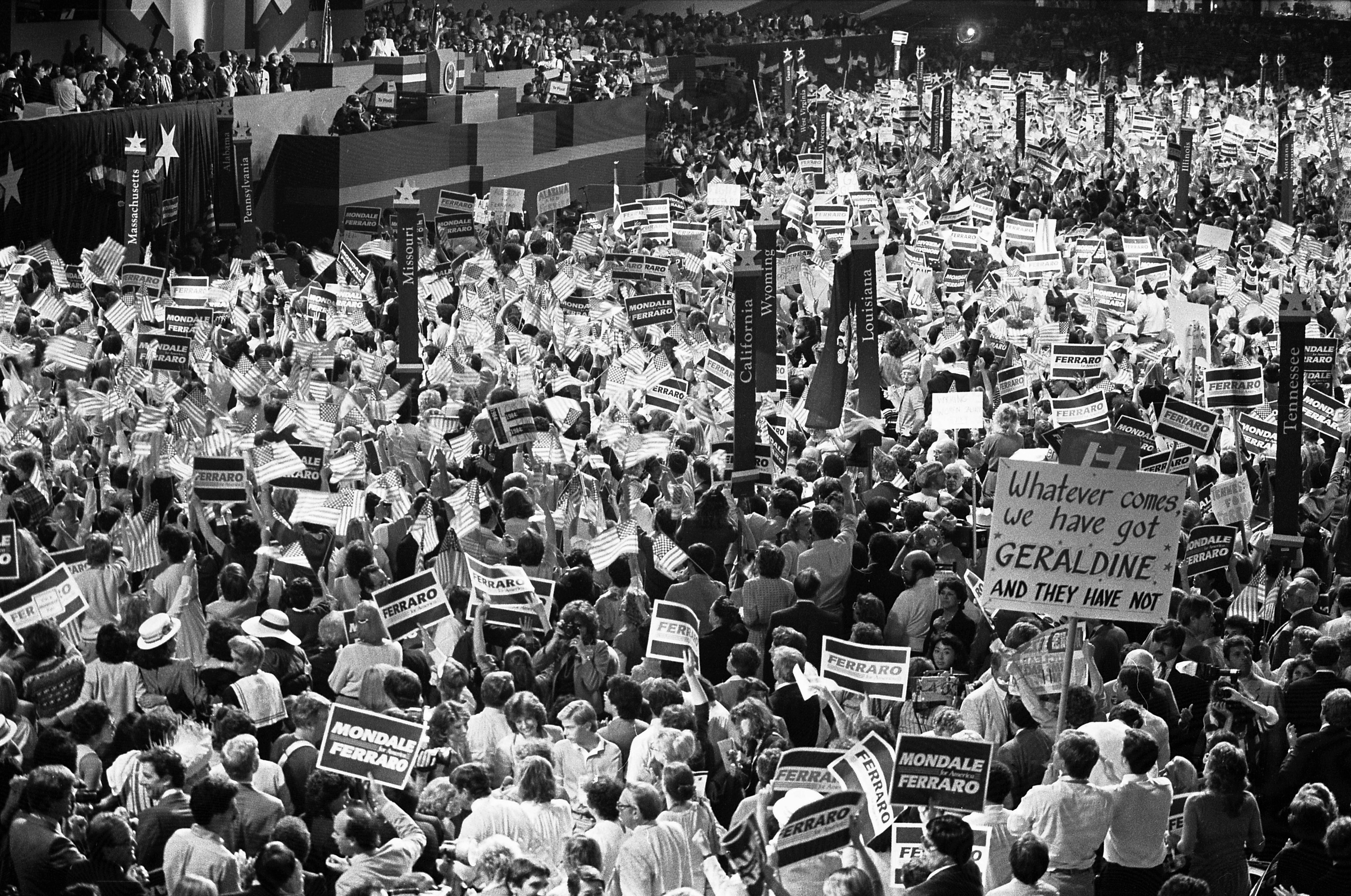
Convention hall during Ferraro's vice presidential nomination acceptance speech

Walter Mondale was nominated for president and Geraldine Ferraro was nominated for vice president.

New York Governor Mario Cuomo gave a well-received keynote speech. Mondale's major rivals for the presidential nomination, Senator Gary Hart and Rev. Jesse Jackson, also gave speeches.

Jackson's speech referred to the nation as a "quilt" with places for "[t]he white, the Hispanic, the black, the Arab, the Jew, the woman, the Native American, the small farmer, the business person, the environmentalist, the peace activist, the young, the old, the lesbian, the gay, and the disabled". It was the first time anyone mentioned lesbians and gays in a national convention address. Jackson also attempted to move the party's platform farther to the left at the convention, but without much success. He did succeed in one instance, concerning affirmative action.

"AIDS poster boy" Bobbi Campbell gave a speech at the National March for Lesbian and Gay Rights, dying of AIDS complications a month later.

== Voting ==
The following candidates had their names placed in nomination

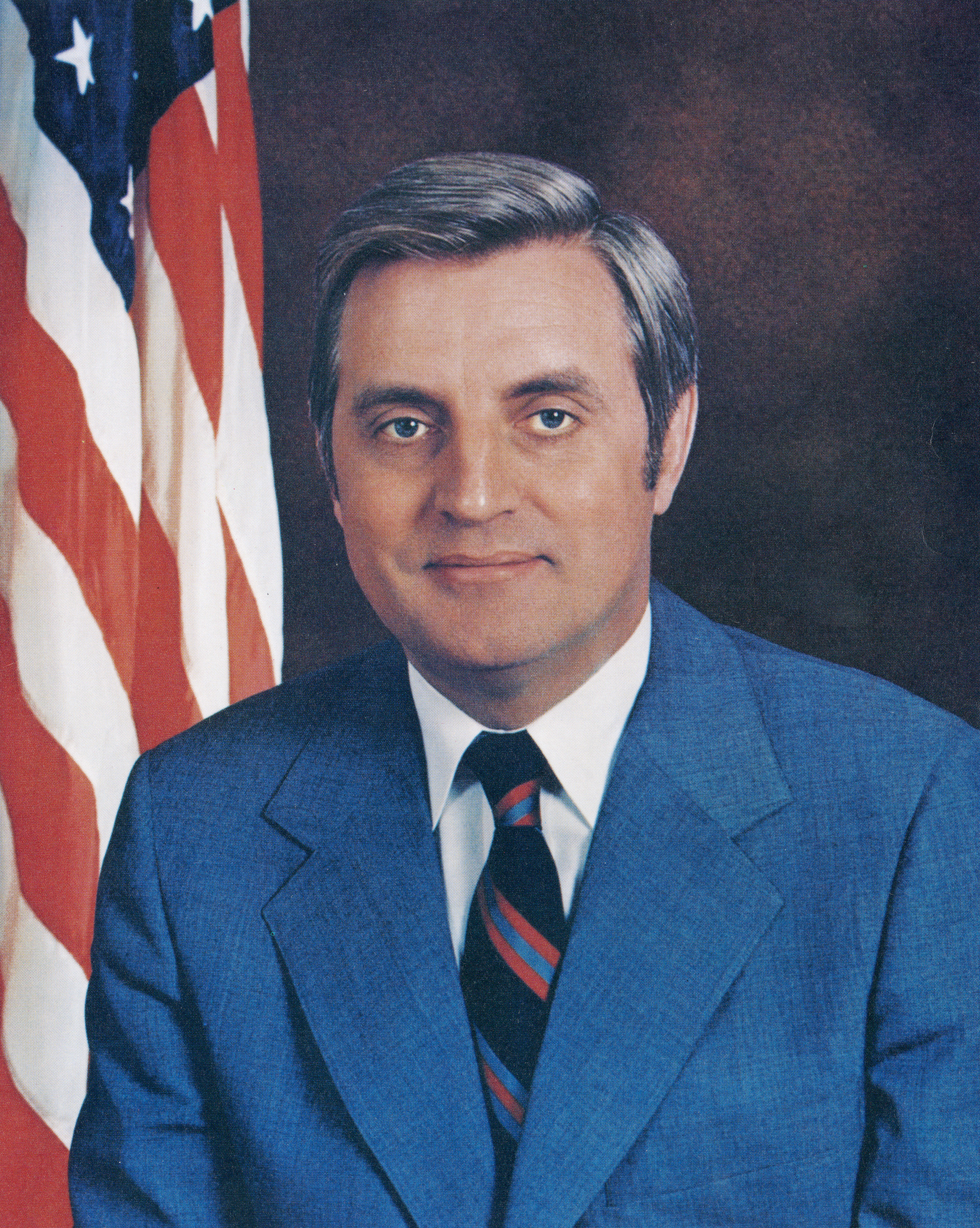
Former Vice President Walter Mondale from Minnesota

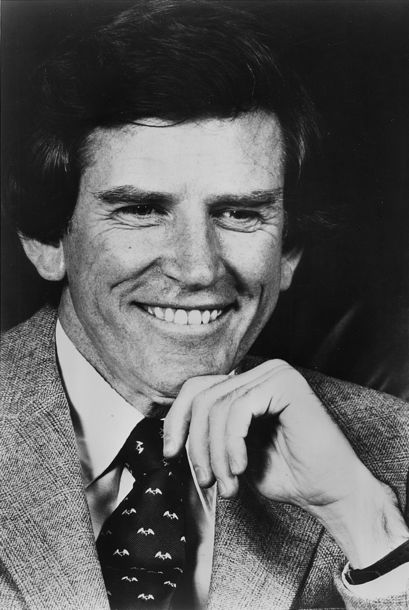
Senator Gary Hart of Colorado

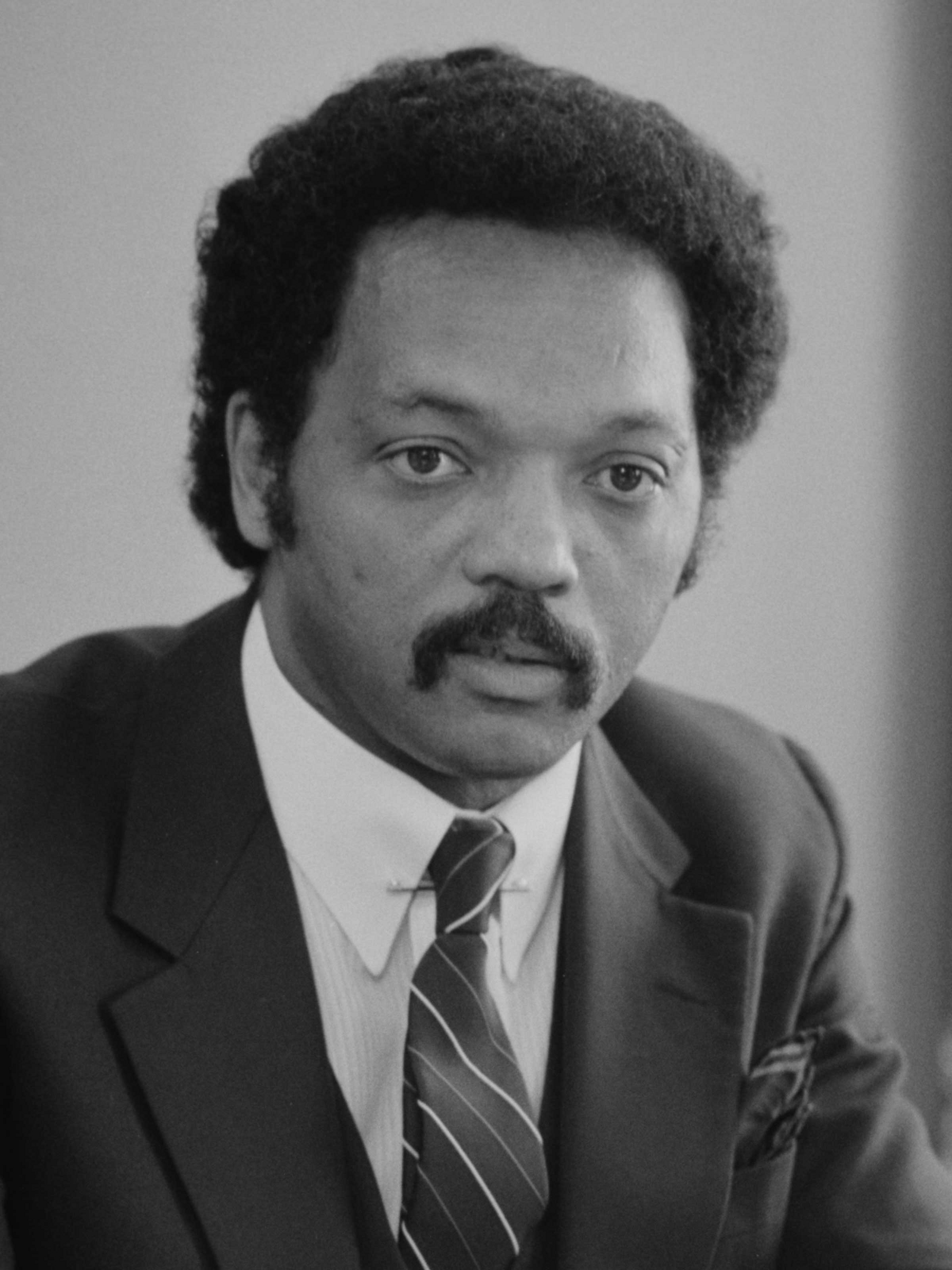
Reverend Jesse Jackson of Illinois

=== President ===
Before the convention had convened, Mondale was widely regarded as having secured the prerequisite delegate support to clinch the nomination. However, he only attained this amount of delegate support with the inclusion of superdelegates that supported his candidacy. His number of pledged delegates (those bound to him and awarded through primaries) alone did not give him enough of a lead to win the nomination without superdelegate support. His number of pledged delegates heading into the convention was 40 shy of the 1,967 needed to win the nomination.

Jesse Jackson had unsuccessfully called for the suspension of the party's electoral rules to give him a number of delegates closer to the 20% average share of the vote he garnered during the primaries. The system tended to punish shallow showings as yielding no delegates at all, hence Jackson's smaller delegate count than would be expected (12%).

Reo Kirkland, a member of the Alabama Senate and Alabama delegation, was bound to Hart, but voted for Martha Kirkland, his mother and a probate judge in Escambia County, Florida.

Keron Kerr, an uncommitted delegate from Maine and secretary of the Maine Democratic Party, voted for U.S. Senator Joe Biden. She first considered voting for him after seeing him speak at the 1983 Maine Democratic state convention and decided to support him after his speech at the DNC. Kerr later served as a state coordinator for Biden's 1988 presidential campaign.

The candidates for U.S. president received the following numbers of delegates:

Democratic National Convention presidential vote, 1984
Candidate	Votes	Percentage
Walter Mondale	2,191	56.41%
Gary Hart	1,201	30.92%
Jesse Jackson	466	12.00%
Thomas Eagleton	18	0.46%
George McGovern	4	0.10%
John Glenn	2	0.05%
Joe Biden	1	0.03%
Martha Kirkland	1	0.03%
Totals	3,884	100.00%

=== Vice president ===
For Vice President of the United States, Mondale had a pick between Mayor Dianne Feinstein of San Francisco (future five-term United States Senator from California) and Congresswoman Geraldine Ferraro of New York; he chose Congresswoman Ferraro to be his vice presidential running mate, which established her as the first woman to be nominated for Vice President of the United States from a major American political party. Until 2024, this was the most recent time that neither a sitting nor former United States Senator was nominated for vice president by the Democratic Party.

== See also ==
- 1984 Democratic Party presidential primaries
- Rosalind Wiener Wyman, chair and chief executive officer of the convention
- 1983 Libertarian National Convention
- 1984 Republican National Convention
- 1984 United States presidential election
- History of the United States Democratic Party
- List of Democratic National Conventions
- United States presidential nominating convention
- Walter Mondale 1984 presidential campaign

== Works cited ==
- "Who Is Martha Kirkland?". United Press International. July 19, 1984.

Preceded by 1980; New York, New York	Democratic National Conventions	Succeeded by 1988; Atlanta, Georgia
