= Kennedy presidential campaign =

Kennedy presidential campaign may refer to any of the following presidential campaigns conducted by members of the Kennedy family:

- John F. Kennedy 1960 presidential campaign, a successful election campaign resulting in him being elected the 35th president of the United States
- Robert F. Kennedy 1968 presidential campaign, an unsuccessful primary campaign for the Democratic nomination, ending with him being assassinated
- Ted Kennedy 1980 presidential campaign, an unsuccessful primary campaign for the Democratic nomination
- Robert F. Kennedy Jr. 2024 presidential campaign, an ongoing election campaign for the Independent party, previously ran for the Democratic nomination
