= Hunt Commission =

Commission set up in 1981 by the Democratic Party in the United States

The Hunt Commission or Commission on Presidential Nominations was a commission set up in 1981 by the Democratic Party in the United States in order to change the way that the party selected its presidential candidate. The commission was chaired by then-North Carolina Governor James Hunt.

== Background ==
The 1980 Democratic National Convention saw a bitter fight over rules and platform issues. In response to this, the Hunt Commission was convened in 1981.

== Effects ==
The most prominent result of the commission was the creation of superdelegates. Additionally, it lowered the percentage of delegates needed to gain representation at the convention, to 25% for primary states, and 20% for those holding caucuses. It also recommended that states make efforts to include low- and moderate-income individuals in their convention delegate pools. The commission recognized that states which organized primaries or caucuses earlier in the year received greater media attention, and so, in response, allowed states to hold nominating events over the course of three months, but allowed New Hampshire to hold its primary no more than one week before other states, and Iowa to hold its caucuses no more than 15 days before the rest of the states.

== See also ==
- McGovern–Fraser Commission
