= 1980 Alabama Democratic presidential primary =

- March 11, 1980

45 Democratic National Convention delegates (31 from congressional districts, 4 chosen by CD delegates, 10 chosen by the SDEC)

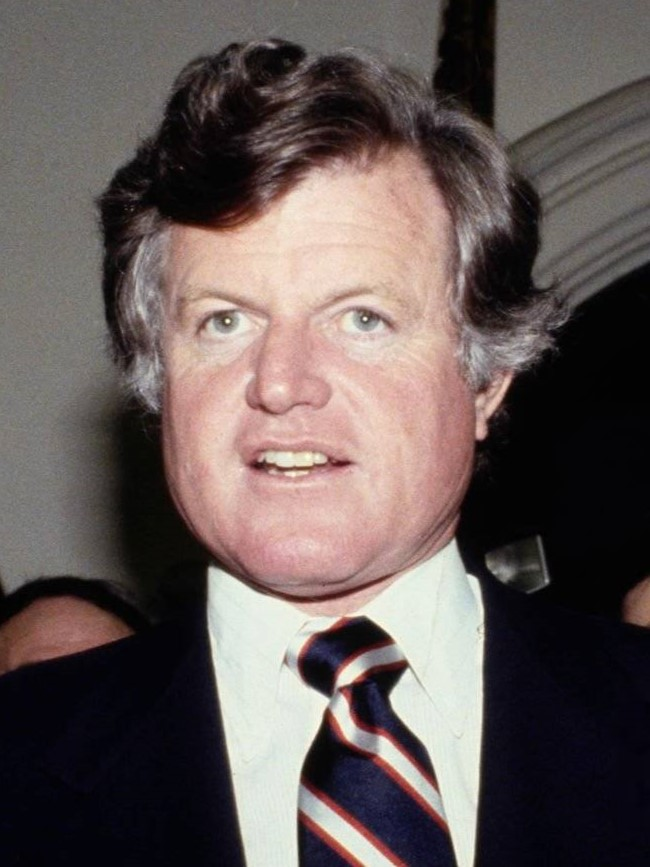
Candidate	Jimmy Carter	Ted Kennedy
Home state	Georgia	Massachusetts
Delegate count	29	2
Popular vote	193,734	31,382
Percentage	81.58%	13.22%
Congressional district results
Carter
70–80%
80–90%

A presidential primary was held in the U.S. state of Alabama on March 11, 1980, to elect delegates representing Alabama to the 1980 Democratic National Convention. Of the state's forty-five allotted delegates, thirty-one slots were distributed throughout the state's seven congressional districts, with the remaining being hand-picked by the elected delegates and the State Democratic Executive Committee. Incumbent President Jimmy Carter, a Southerner, easily won the Alabama primary, reportedly winning every county in the state by a substantial majority. Carter won forty-three delegates in total, and primary opponent and U.S. Senator from Massachusetts Ted Kennedy won two: one each from the third and sixth congressional district. 526 Alabamians reportedly sought election to the state's thirty-one congressional district delegate slots.

== Results ==
Alabama Democratic presidential primary, 1980
Candidate	Popular vote		Elected delegates		
Candidate	#	%	Direct	Indirect	Total
Jimmy Carter	193,734	81.58%	29	14	43
Ted Kennedy	31,382	13.22%	2	0	2
Jerry Brown	9,529	4.01%	0	0	0
Uncommitted	1,670	0.70%	0	0	0
William Nuckols	609	0.26%	0	0	0
Bob Maddox	540	0.23%	0	0	0
Total	237,464	100.00%	31	14	45

=== Results by congressional district ===
District	Jerry Brown			Jimmy Carter			Ted Kennedy			Bob Maddox			William Nuckols			Uncommitted			Margin		Total	
District	#	%	D	#	%	D	#	%	D	#	%	D	#	%	D	#	%	D	#	%	#	D
1st	650	2.20%	0	24,145	81.65%	4	4,043	13.67%	0	110	0.37%	0	143	0.48%	0	481	1.63%	0	20,102	67.98%	29,572	4
2nd	1,179	3.85%	0	24,804	80.99%	4	4,411	14.40%	0	52	0.17%	0	37	0.12%	0	142	0.46%	0	20,393	66.59%	30,625	4
3rd	1,481	4.26%	0	27,270	78.38%	3	5,542	15.93%	1	97	0.28%	0	172	0.49%	0	229	0.66%	0	21,728	62.45%	34,791	4
4th	774	2.24%	0	30,633	88.62%	5	2,806	8.12%	0	107	0.31%	0	41	0.12%	0	207	0.60%	0	27,827	80.50%	34,568	5
5th	2,503	5.73%	0	36,124	82.74%	5	4,612	10.56%	0	91	0.21%	0	65	0.15%	0	266	0.61%	0	31,512	72.17%	43,661	5
6th	1,462	4.99%	0	22,709	77.51%	3	4,864	16.60%	1	31	0.11%	0	75	0.26%	0	159	0.54%	0	17,845	60.90%	29,300	4
7th	1,480	4.23%	0	28,049	80.26%	5	5,104	14.60%	0	52	0.15%	0	76	0.22%	0	186	0.53%	0	22,945	65.66%	34,947	5
Total	9,529	4.01%	0	193,734	81.58%	29	31,382	13.22%	2	540	0.23%	0	609	0.26%	0	1,670	0.70%	0	162,352	68.37%	237,464	31
Source: Secretary of State of Alabama

== See also ==
- 1980 Democratic Party presidential primaries
- 1980 United States presidential election
- 1980 United States presidential election in Alabama
- 1980 United States elections
