= McGovern–Fraser Commission =

1968 commission created by the Democratic National Convention

The McGovern–Fraser Commission, formally known as Commission on Party Structure and Delegate Selection, was a commission created by the Democratic National Committee (DNC) in response to the tumultuous 1968 Democratic National Convention. It was composed of 28 members, selected by DNC chairman Senator Fred R. Harris in 1969 to rewrite the Democratic Party's rules regarding the selection of national convention delegates. Senator George McGovern and later Representative Donald M. Fraser led the commission, which is how it received its name. McGovern, who resigned from the commission in 1971 in order to run for president, won the first nomination decided under the new rules in 1972, but lost the general election to Richard Nixon.

== Purpose ==
The events at and around the Democratic national convention of 1968 left the party in disarray, unable to support its nominee and divided over matters of both substance and procedure. The 1968 convention was disastrous for the Democrats, as much because of the demonstrations and violent police responses outside the convention hall as because of the convention itself. What took place in Chicago went well beyond party leaders' ignoring one candidate, Eugene McCarthy, who could claim to have demonstrated his appeal to voters in the primaries and nominating another, Hubert Humphrey, who had not entered a single primary. Dissatisfaction with the perceived undemocratic nature of the nominating process led Democrats to create a commission that would ensure greater democratic input into how nominees were selected. The establishment of the commission was approved on the second day of the convention. Its initial mandate was to examine current rules and make recommendations designed to broaden participation in the nominating process; later, as the commission evolved, it sought specifically to enable better representation among convention delegates of minorities, women, and young people – groups that had previously been underrepresented.

== The Commission Report ==
The Commission was mainly concerned with developing rules that would govern the 1972 Democratic convention. The Commission report was written in less than nine months and was divided into two parts, one that recommended 18 guidelines for state parties and another recommending steps deemed desirable for state parties to take. The report attempted to bring uniformity to the delegate selection process and to give greater influence to those in the past that had a marginal voice, mainly women, blacks and young people (defined as those under 30).

Some of the guidelines are as follows:

The first guideline ordered state parties to "adopt explicit written Party rules governing delegate selection. It was followed by eight "procedural rules and safeguards" which the commission demanded be applied in the delegate selection process. Specifically, the states were henceforth to forbid proxy voting; forbid the use of the unit rule and related practices such as instructing delegations; require a quorum of not less than 40 percent at all party committee meetings; remove all mandatory assessments of delegates and limit mandatory participation fees to no more than $10; ensure that party meetings in non rural areas were held on uniform dates, at uniform times and in places of easy access; ensure adequate public notice of all party meetings concerned with delegate selection.

Other guidelines included that:

- State organizations select no more than 10 percent of the delegation by state committee
- State organizations prohibit the ex officio designation of delegates to the National convention
- State organizations designate the procedures by which slates are prepared and challenged
- State delegate apportionment within states was to be based on a formula giving equal weight to total population and to the Democratic vote in the previous Presidential election
- State organizations to overcome the effects of past discrimination by affirmative steps to encourage representation on the National Convention delegation of minority groups, young people and women in reasonable relationship to their presence in the population of the State
- Petition requirements for delegate candidates be eliminated
- Elimination of restrictions on voter registration such as literacy tests and lengthy residency requirements
- Called for a uniform standard formula for delegate selection across the States

Controversies included those over the following guidelines:

- The unit rule, defined by the committee report as "a practice by which a majority of a meeting or delegation can bind a dissenting minority to vote in accordance with the wishes of the majority." Some argue that the abolished unit rule was replaced by a very similar system of proportional representation, which would essentially create the same outcome as the previous unit rule. The proportional representation would create a winner-takes-all system, which would begin at the county level which would allow the majority to override the minorities and send their delegates.
- Quotas were very controversial, some claiming that they were reverse discrimination and that they "made it too easy for inexperienced amateurs-not dedicated to the party or to the goal of winning elections- to take over a national convention
- Some scholars and party leaders claim that the guidelines, particularly those that gave more power to party amateurs, were written in favor of Senator McGovern being nominated as a presidential candidate in 1972.

== Effect on presidential primaries ==
The McGovern–Fraser Commission established open procedures and affirmative action guidelines for selecting delegates. In addition the commission made it so that all delegate selection procedures were required to be open; party leaders could no longer handpick the convention delegates in secret. The commission recommended that delegates be represented by the proportion of their population in each state. An unforeseen result of these rules was that many states complied by holding primary elections to select convention delegates. This created a shift from caucuses to primaries. The Republican Party's nomination process was also transformed in this way, as state laws involving primaries usually apply to all parties' selection of delegates.

Women accounted for 13% of the southern delegates at the 1968 convention, but rose to 36% at the 1972 convention and continued to rise to parity with male delegates at following conventions. Black delegates from the south rose from none in 1960, to 10% in 1968, and 24% in 1972. Black delegates continued to increase to account for one-third of the southern delegates at the 1988 convention, with them accounting for 46% of the Deep South's delegates.

One of the unintended consequences of McGovern-Fraser reforms was an enormous surge in the number of state party presidential primaries. Prior to the reforms, Democrats in two-thirds of the states used elite-run state conventions to choose convention delegates. In the post-reform era, over three-quarters of the states use primary elections to choose delegates, and over 80% of convention delegates are selected in these primaries. This is true for Republicans as well.

Nominating procedures are determined by states, and there are three basic types of primary. The two simplest primary forms are what are referred to as "open" and "closed" primaries. In the open primary, any registered voter may participate regardless of partisan affiliation. This category also includes states that allow same-day party registration. Conversely, in the closed primary, only same-party registered partisans may participate. Modified-open primaries encompass a broad category of voting rules that are neither fully closed nor fully open for all to participate and include primaries where same-party registrants may participate with "independents," "unenrolled," "unaffiliated," or "undeclared" voters. In the 2000 election, 35 percent of Democratic primaries and 31 percent of Republican primaries are closed to registered party members: 41 percent of Democratic and Republican primaries are open to all registered voters, and the remaining 24 percent and 28 percent of Democratic and Republican primaries, respectively, are characterized by modified-open procedures.

== Critiques ==
A number of authorities criticize the reforms as having created too much democracy, or a badly conceived democracy, leaving too much of the nominations decision up to an allegedly uninformed, unrepresented, and/or uninterested electorate.

Even before the introduction of the McGovern-Fraser presidential nominating reforms, academics and political practitioners alike wrestled with the questions of nominating procedures, the representativeness of primary electorates, and their implications for democracy. Strong party proponents worried that primaries dilute party influence over nominations and thus impeded party discipline and effectiveness in governing. Others have contended that the biases inherent in the primary electorates (the over-representation of some groups and the under-representation of others) deprive minority groups of their democratic voice.

Beyond the scholarly debates surrounding the direct primary, political parties and their operatives have voiced pragmatic concerns regarding the types of candidates that primaries tend to favor, suggesting that they often produce ideologically extreme candidates who are not always attractive to more moderate, general election voters. The question of representation and the extent to which primary voters reflect the demographic and attitudinal characteristics of nonvoters and rank-and-file partisans generally has been a long-standing concern to students of primary politics. Some scholars conclude that primary voters are demographically unrepresentative of the larger partisan electorate, while others find fewer differences.

Fred Dutton, one of the commission members, has been accused of diminishing the influence of unions.

As McGovern later said, "I opened up the doors of the Democratic Party, and 20 million people walked out."

== See also ==
- Hunt Commission

== Works cited ==
- Black, Earl; Black, Merle (1992). The Vital South: How Presidents Are Elected. Harvard University Press. ISBN 0674941306.

== Bibliography ==
- Edwards, George C., III; Robert L. Lineberry; and Martin P. Wattenberg (2006). Government in America. Pearson Education. ISBN 0-321-29236-7.
- Maisel, L. Sandy (1987). Parties and Elections in America: The Electoral Process. McGraw-Hill. ISBN 0-7425-4764-7.
- Truman, David B. "Party reform, party atrophy, and constitutional change: Some reflections". Political Science Quarterly 99.4 (Winter 1984–1985): 637–655. JSTOR 2150705.
