= 1980 Democratic National Convention =

U.S. political event held in Madison Square Garden in New York City

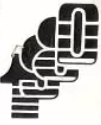
- 1980 presidential election

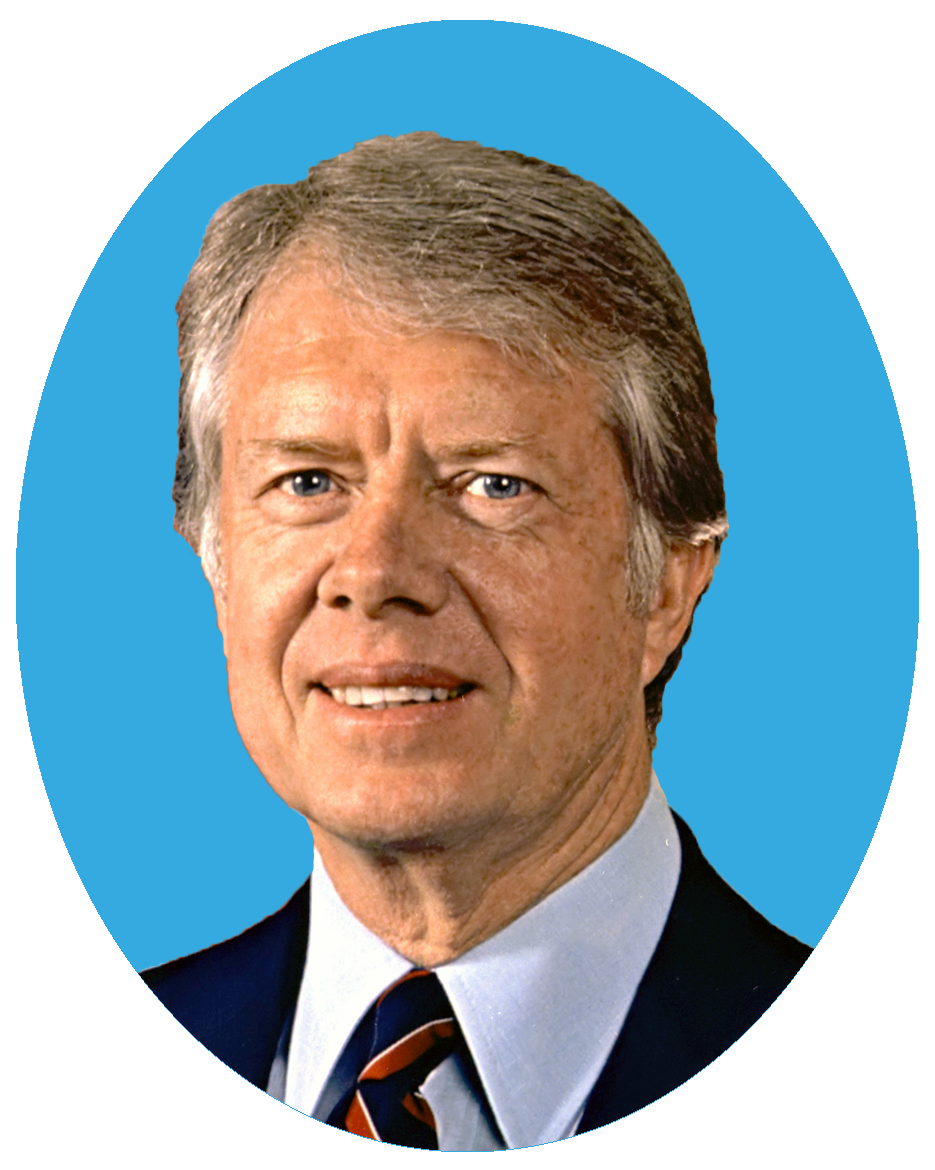
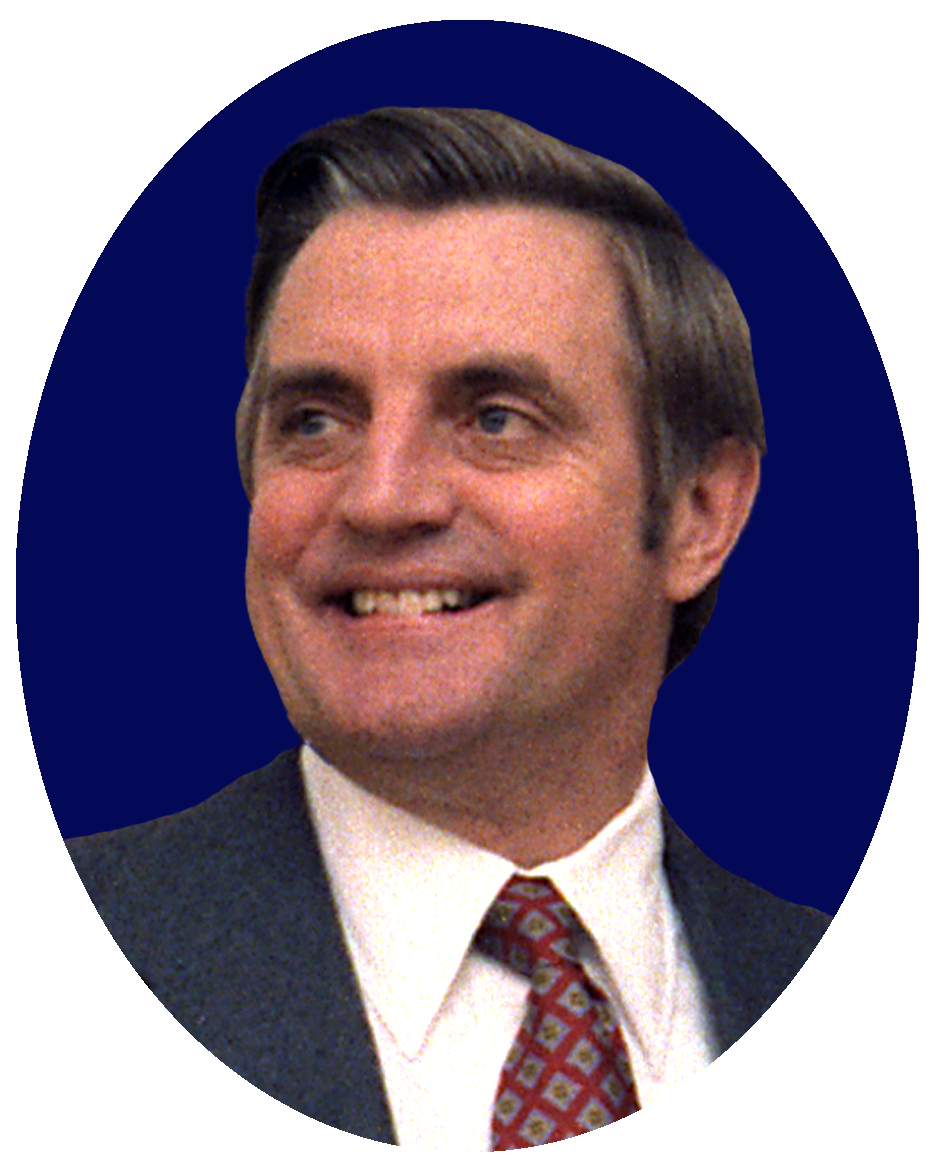
- Nominees; Carter and Mondale

Convention
- Date(s): August 11–14, 1980
- City: New York, New York
- Venue: Madison Square Garden
- Notable speakers: Ted Kennedy; Abe Beame; Geraldine Ferraro; Bruce Sundlun; Ruth Messinger; Thomas Addison; Ed Koch; Robert Abrams; Bella Abzug; Mario Biaggi; Steve Westly; Howard Dean

Candidates
- Presidential nominee: Jimmy Carter of Georgia
- Vice-presidential nominee: Walter Mondale of Minnesota

Voting
- Total delegates: 3,346
- Votes needed for nomination: 1,674
- Results (president): Carter (Georgia): 2,129.02 (63.63%); Kennedy (Massachusetts): 1,150.48 (34.38%); Carey (New York): 16 (0.48%); Proxmire (Wisconsin): 10 (0.30%); Others: 40.5 (1.21%)
- Results (vice president): Mondale (Minnesota): 2,428.7 (72.91%); Not Voting: 723.3 (21.72%); Scattering: 179 (5.37%)
- Ballots: 1

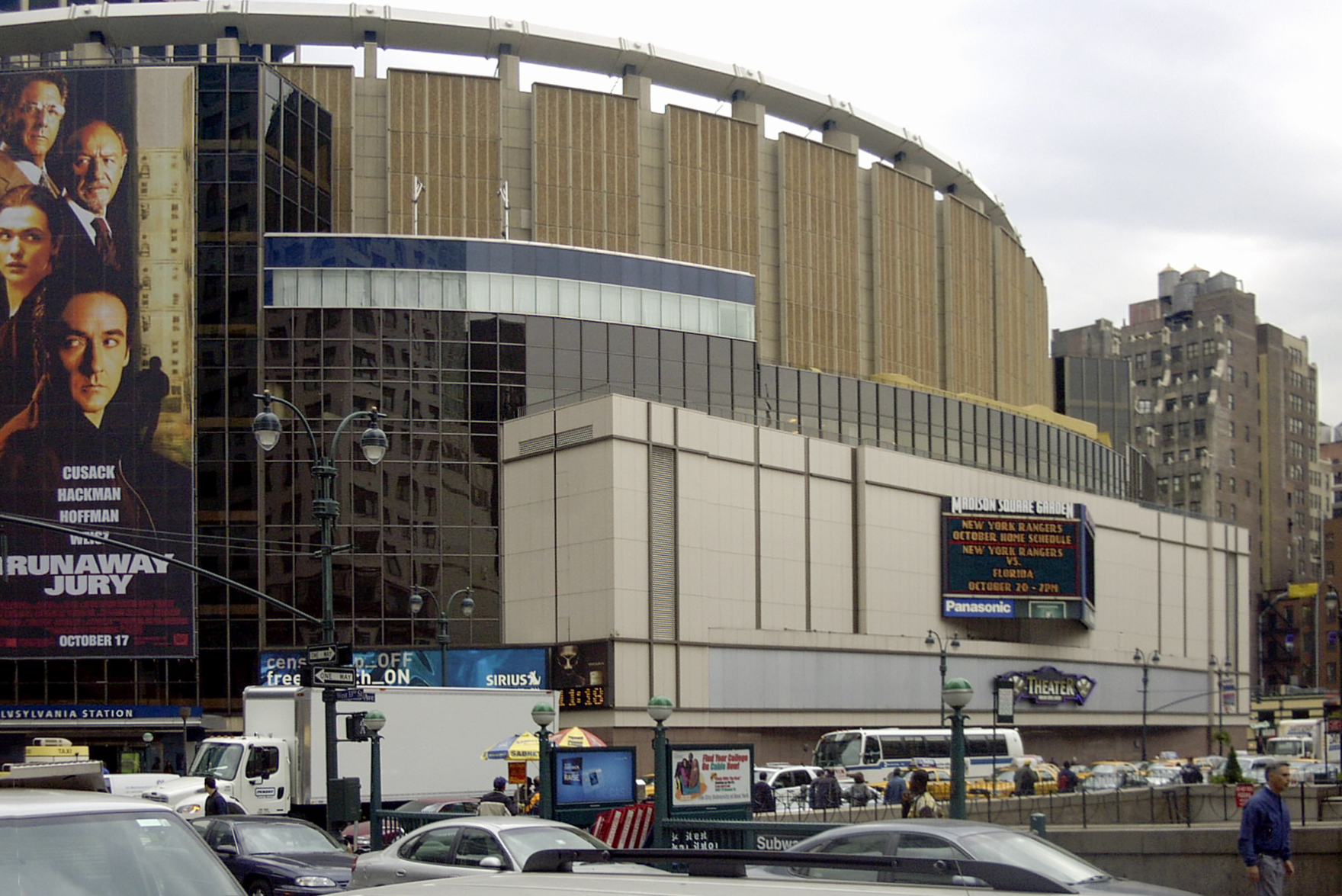
Madison Square Garden was the site of the 1980 Democratic National Convention

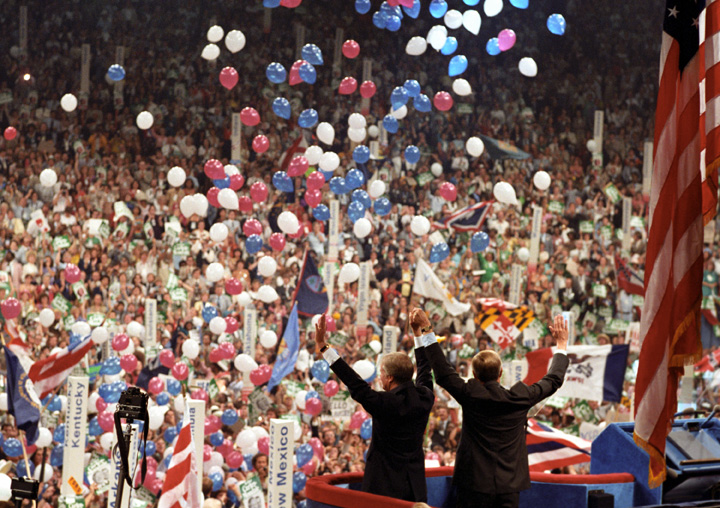
Carter and Mondale stand together during the balloon drop at the end of the convention

The 1980 Democratic National Convention nominated President Jimmy Carter and Vice President Walter Mondale for reelection. The convention was held in Madison Square Garden in New York City from August 11 to August 14, 1980.

The 1980 convention was notable as it was the last time in the 20th century, for either major party, that a candidate tried to get delegates released from their voting commitments. This was done by Senator Ted Kennedy, Carter's chief rival for the nomination in the Democratic primaries, who sought the votes of delegates held by Carter.

== Notable speakers ==
After losing his challenge for the nomination earlier that day, Ted Kennedy spoke on August 12 and delivered a speech in support of President Jimmy Carter and the Democratic Party. Kennedy's famous speech eventually closed with the lines: "For me, a few hours ago, this campaign came to an end. For all those whose cares have been our concern, the work goes on, the cause endures, the hope still lives, and the dream shall never die." His speech was written by Bob Shrum.

Various prominent delegates to this convention included Abe Beame, Geraldine Ferraro, Bruce Sundlun, Ruth Messinger, Thomas Addison, Ed Koch, Robert Abrams, Bella Abzug, Mario Biaggi, Steve Westly, and Howard Dean.

== Voting ==
Candidates

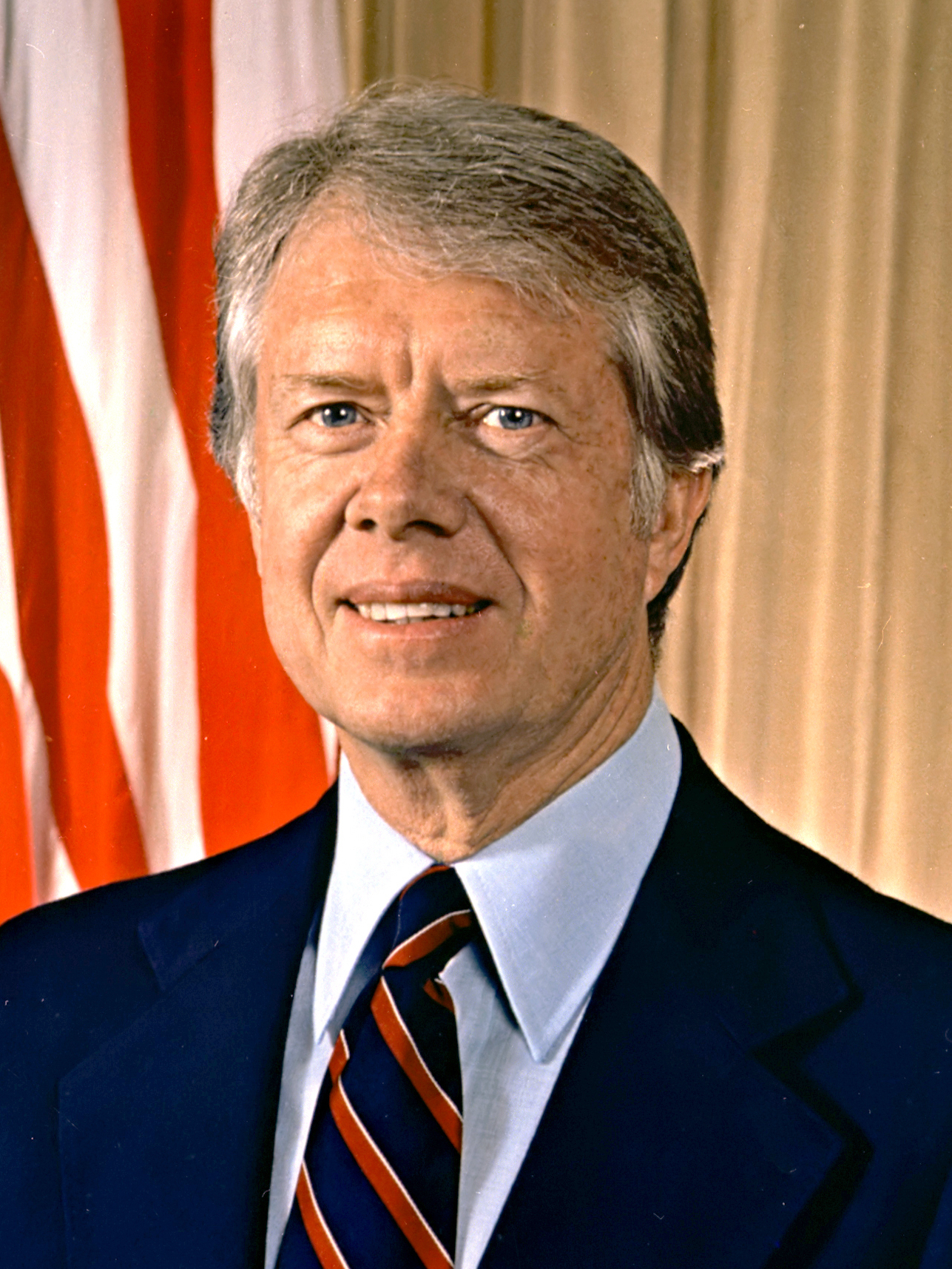
President
Jimmy Carter
of Georgia

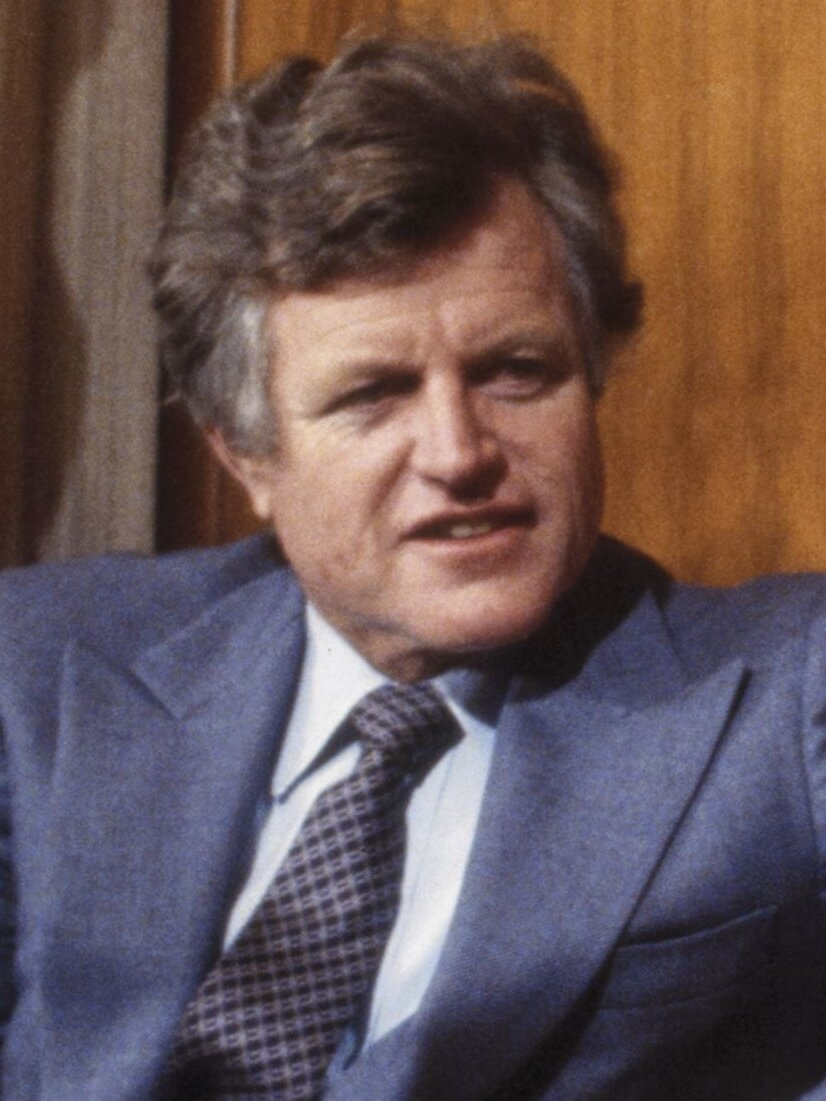
Senator
Ted Kennedy
of Massachusetts

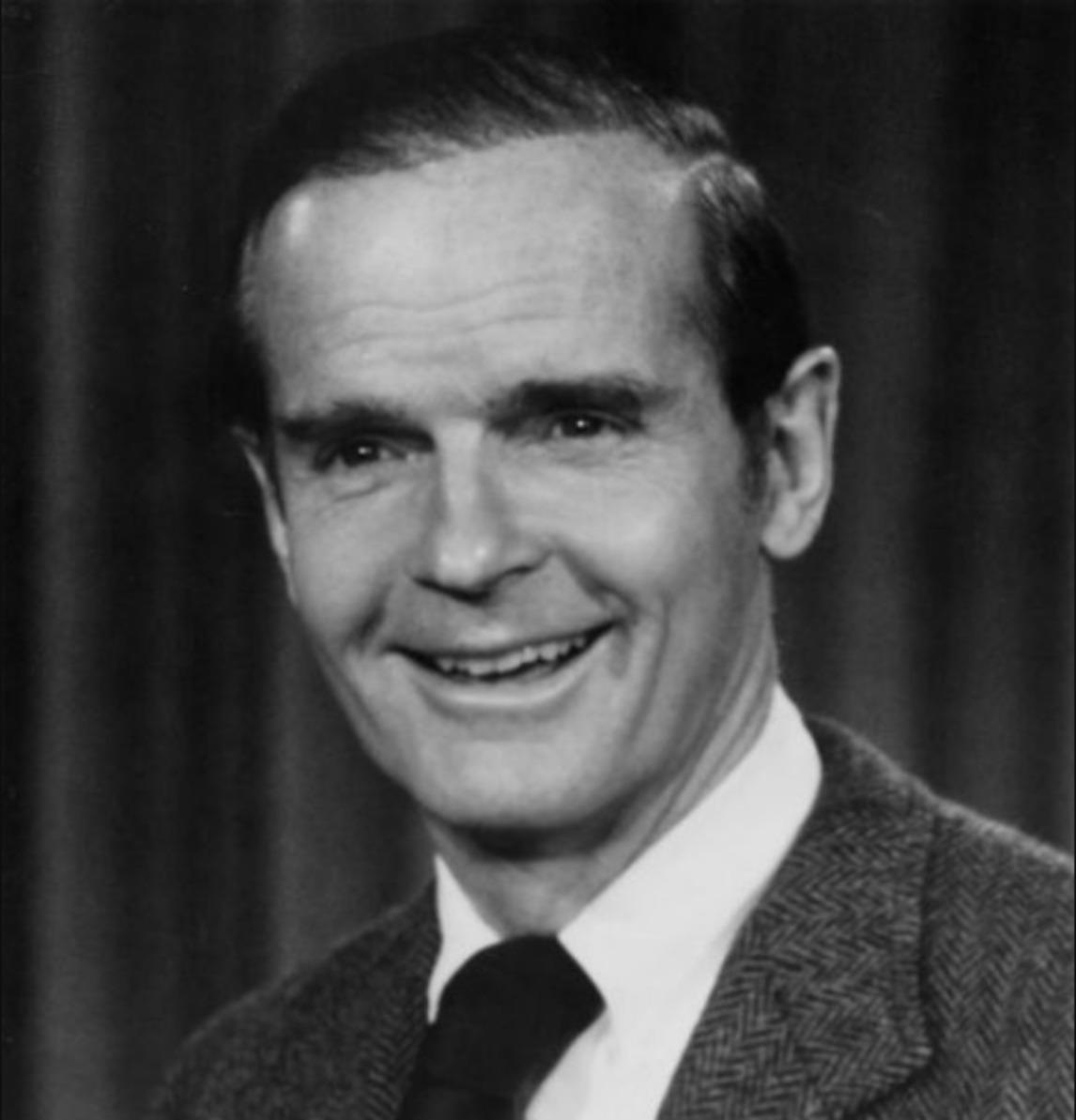
Senator
William Proxmire
of Wisconsin

=== President ===
Delegate voting results

Democratic National Convention presidential vote, 1980
Candidate	Votes	Percentage
Jimmy Carter (inc.)	2,123	64.04%
Ted Kennedy	1,151	34.72%
William Proxmire	10	0.30%
Koryne Kaneski Horbal	5	0.15%
Scott M. Matheson	5	0.15%
Ron Dellums	3	0.09%
Robert Byrd	2	0.06%
John Culver	2	0.06%
Kent Hance	2	0.06%
Jennings Randolph	2	0.06%
Warren Spannaus	2	0.06%
Alice Tripp	2	0.06%
Jerry Brown	1	0.03%
Dale Bumpers	1	0.03%
Hugh L. Carey	1	0.03%
Walter Mondale	1	0.03%
Edmund Muskie	1	0.03%
Thomas J. Steed	1	0.03%
Totals	3,315	100.00%

=== Vice president ===
After Ted Kennedy lost the presidential nomination contest, over 700 of his delegates walked out of the convention, and the rest decided to scatter their votes. It took several roll calls to conclude the ballot.

As of 2024, this is the last time that the Democratic Party has required a roll call for the vice presidential spot.

Vice Presidential tally:

Democratic National Convention Vice presidential vote, 1980
Candidate	Votes	percentage
Walter Mondale (inc.)	2,429	72.90%
Melvin Boozer	48	1.44%
Ed Rendell	28	0.84%
Roberto A. Mondragon	19	0.57%
Patricia Stone Simon	11	0.33%
Tom Daschle (under 35 years old)	10	0.30%
Ted Kulongoski	8	0.24%
Shirley Chisholm	6	0.18%
Terry Chisholm	6	0.18%
Barbara Jordan	4	0.12%
Richard M. Nolan	4	0.12%
Patrick Joseph Lucey	3	0.09%
Jerry Brown	2	0.06%
George McGovern	2	0.06%
Eric Tovar	2	0.06%
Mo Udall	2	0.06%
Les Aspin	1	0.03%
Mario Biaggi	1	0.03%
George S. Broody	1	0.03%
Michelle Kathleen Gray (under 35 years old)	1	0.03%
Michael J. Harrington	1	0.03%
Frank Johnson	1	0.03%
Eunice Kennedy Shriver	1	0.03%
Dennis Krumm	1	0.03%
Mary Ann Kuharski	1	0.03%
Jim McDermott	1	0.03%
Barbara Mikulski	1	0.03%
Gaylord Nelson	1	0.03%
George Orwell (non-American, deceased)	1	0.03%
Charles Prine Sr.	1	0.03%
William A. Redmond	1	0.03%
Jim Thomas	1	0.03%
Elly Uharis	1	0.03%
Jim Weaver	1	0.03%
William Winpisinger	1	0.03%
Abstained/absent	728	21.85%

== The President's acceptance speech ==
President Carter gave his speech accepting the party's nomination on August 14. This was notable for his gaffe intended to be a tribute to Hubert Humphrey, whom he referred to as "Hubert Horatio Hornblower".

On November 4, President Carter and Vice President Mondale lost to Ronald Reagan and George H. W. Bush in the general election, having lost both the popular election by 8,423,115 votes and the Electoral College by 440 votes.

== Platform ==
=== Abortion ===
In addition to its 1976 stance that merely opposed overturning Roe v. Wade, the 1980 platform for the first time explicitly supported the Roe decision as the law of the land.

== See also ==
- 1980 Democratic Party presidential primaries
- 1980 Republican National Convention
- 1980 United States presidential election
- History of the United States Democratic Party
- List of Democratic National Conventions
- United States presidential nominating convention
- Jimmy Carter 1980 presidential campaign

Preceded by 1976; New York, New York	Democratic National Conventions	Succeeded by 1984; San Francisco, California
