= United States presidential nominating convention =

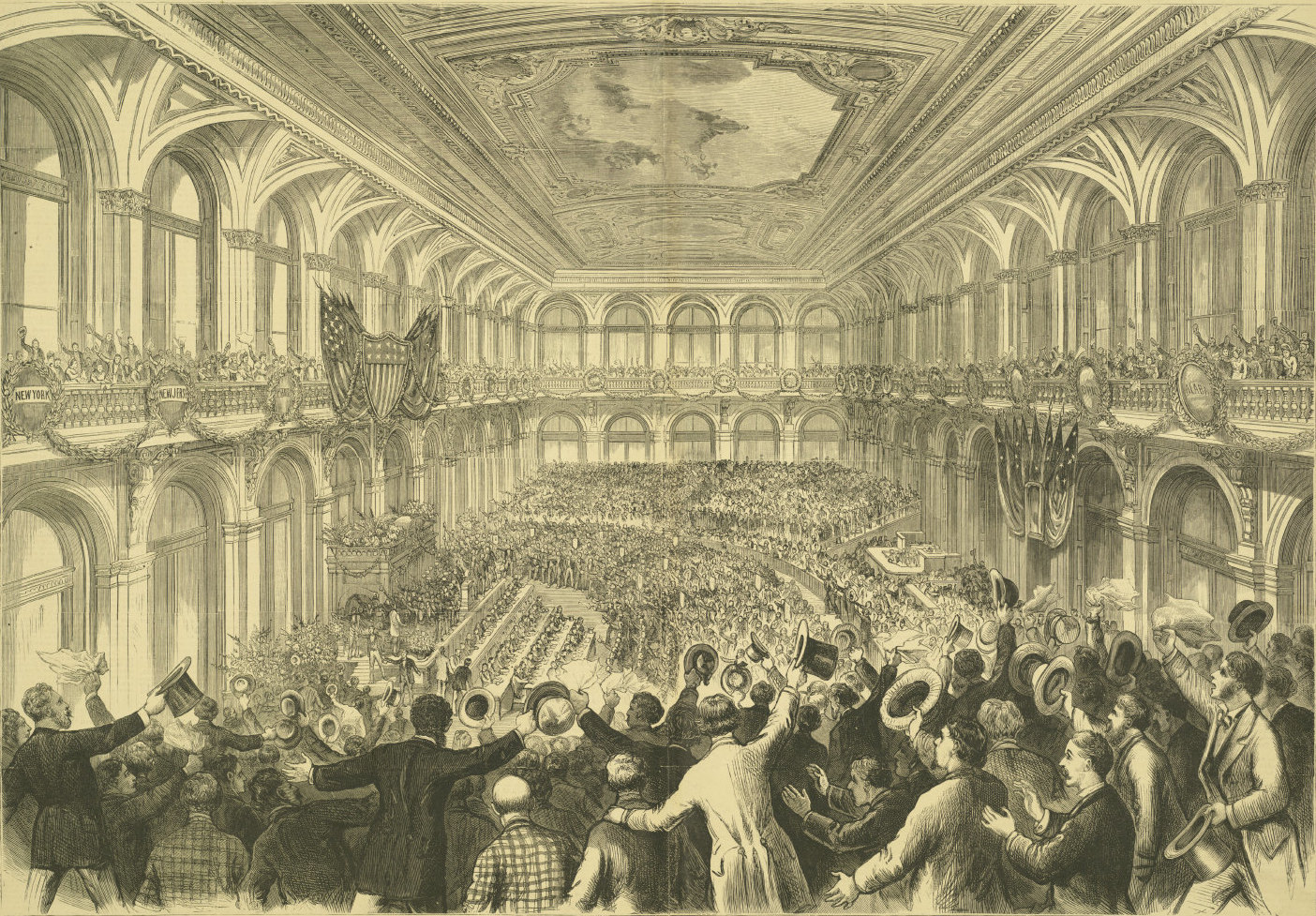
The 1876 Democratic National Convention at the Merchants Exchange Building in St. Louis, Missouri. Samuel J. Tilden and Thomas A. Hendricks were nominated for president and vice president respectively.

A United States presidential nominating convention is a political convention held every four years in the United States by most of the political parties who will be fielding nominees in the upcoming U.S. presidential election. The formal purpose of such a convention is to select the party's nominees for popular election as President and Vice President, as well as to adopt a statement of party principles and goals known as the party platform and adopt the rules for the party's activities, including the presidential nominating process for the next election cycle. Conventions remain an important part of the political process despite the nominees almost always being determined during the primary season, as they provide positive publicity for the nominee and party, which can then lead to a convention bounce.

The earliest public national presidential nominating Conventions have been traced back to the 1832 election, before which smaller groups of party leaders chose the nominee, arguably beginning with the 1796 election. Since 1972, most of the delegates have been selected in presidential primaries state by state. Other delegates to these conventions include political party members who are seated automatically, and are called "unpledged delegates" (also known as "superdelegates") because they can choose for themselves for which candidate they vote. The pledged delegates determined by the primaries generally allow the nominees to be decided before the convention opens, but if no single candidate has secured a majority of both pledged and unpledged delegates then a "brokered convention" can result.

In addition to the two major parties' quadrennial events: the Democratic and Republican National Convention, some minor parties also select their nominees by convention, including the Green Party, the Socialist Party USA, the Libertarian Party, the Constitution Party, and the Reform Party USA.

== Logistics ==
=== Schedule ===
The convention cycle begins with the Call to Convention. Usually issued about 18 months in advance, the Call is an invitation from the national party to the state and territory parties to convene to select a presidential nominee. It also sets out the number of delegates to be awarded to each state or territory, as well as the rules for the nomination process. Since 1964, the conventions are usually scheduled for four days [Monday-Thursday] of business, with the exception of the 1972 Republican and 2012 Democratic conventions, which were scheduled for three days each. (The 2008 and 2012 Republican conventions were essentially three days each due to weather issues, but each remained officially four days)

Since 1936 the party to which the incumbent president belongs has held its convention second. Between 1864 and 1952, the Democrats went second every year (except for 1888). In 1956, when Republican Dwight D. Eisenhower was the incumbent, the Democrats went first for the first time since 1888. So from 1936 to 1952, during administrations led by Democratic presidents Franklin D. Roosevelt and Harry S. Truman, the Democrats had their convention after the Republicans, but it is unclear whether they went second because they held the White House or because they had almost always gone second. 1956 became the first year it was clear a party went second because they were the party of the incumbent, and that protocol has been followed ever since.

Major party conventions from the start through 1948 were mostly held in May and June, with a few exceptions. This might have been due to the lack of air conditioning – the last conventions held without air conditioning were in 1948. Since 1952, all major party conventions have been held in the months of July, August or (for the first time in 2004), finishing in early September. Between the middle of the 20th century and 2004, the two major party conventions were primarily scheduled about one month apart, often with the Summer Olympics in between so they did not have to compete for viewers. In 1996, both conventions were held in August after the Atlanta Olympics in July, and in 2000, both were held in July/August, preceding the Sydney Olympics in late September.

In 2008 and 2012, the Democratic and Republican conventions were scheduled for back-to-back weeks following the conclusion of the Beijing and London Olympics, respectively, resulting in the later conventions starting in September for the first time (Republicans in 2008, Democrats in 2012, with the Democratic start on September 4, 2012, the latest any major convention has started). One reason for these late conventions had to do with campaign finance laws, which allow the candidates to spend an unlimited amount of money before the convention, but forbid fundraising after the convention, for the parties to receive federal campaign funds. However, moving the conventions into early September led to conflicts with the NFL Kickoff game, which is usually held on the first Thursday after Labor Day in September. (The NFL accommodated the conventions and moved its game to an earlier start time in 2008, and to a rare Wednesday in 2012. Convention dates in 2004, and 2016 through 2024 did not conflict with the NFL schedule). Additionally, election laws in some states would likely prevent conventions from moving later into mid-September. Ohio election laws forced the Democrats to schedule a virtual nomination of Kamala Harris prior to the scheduled 2024 convention, to get around an August 7 ballot deadline. (Such deadlines have been waived in one way or another in previous election cycles). Early September conventions also competed for attention with Labor Day itself - a reason the Democrats shortened their 2012 convention to 3 days and started the next day, Tuesday.).

However, Barack Obama's choice not to receive federal campaign funds for the 2008 general election started a trend, and so the campaign finance reason for the late scheduling of conventions has gone away in subsequent cycles.

Finally, within the above general constraints, and the variable scheduling of the Olympics, political reasons can also drive the schedules. For example, the Democratic Party held its 2008 convention after the Beijing Olympics to "maximize momentum for our Democratic ticket in the final months of the Presidential election". In 2016, both the Republican and Democratic conventions moved to July, before the Rio de Janeiro Olympics in August. One reason why the Republican Party wanted a July convention was to help avoid a drawn-out primary battle similar to what happened in 2012 that left the party fractured heading into the general election. The Democrats then followed suit so they could provide a quicker response to the Republicans, rather than wait for a month until after the Olympics were over.

The 2020 Democratic National Convention was originally scheduled to take place July 13–16, but was postponed to August 17–20, 2020, due to the COVID-19 pandemic. The 2020 Republican National Convention took place as scheduled from August 24–27. The Tokyo Olympics, originally scheduled to open on July 24, 2020, were also postponed, because of the pandemic, to July 2021, making 2020 the first time that nominating conventions did not coincide with the Olympics since 1944, when the games were cancelled due to World War II.

The schedule for 2024 returned to the standard for most of the late 20th century, with the conventions bracketing the 2024 Summer Olympics. The 2028 Summer Olympics in Los Angeles start a little earlier, in mid-July, and this had the expected effect on the schedule with the 2028 Democratic Convention scheduled to start Aug 7, and with the GOP likely to follow in mid-late August. And unlike the 2000 Sydney Olympics, which were held in late September, the 2032 Brisbane Olympics start on July 23, 2032, potentially allowing a normal convention bracketing schedule in that year.

=== Participation ===
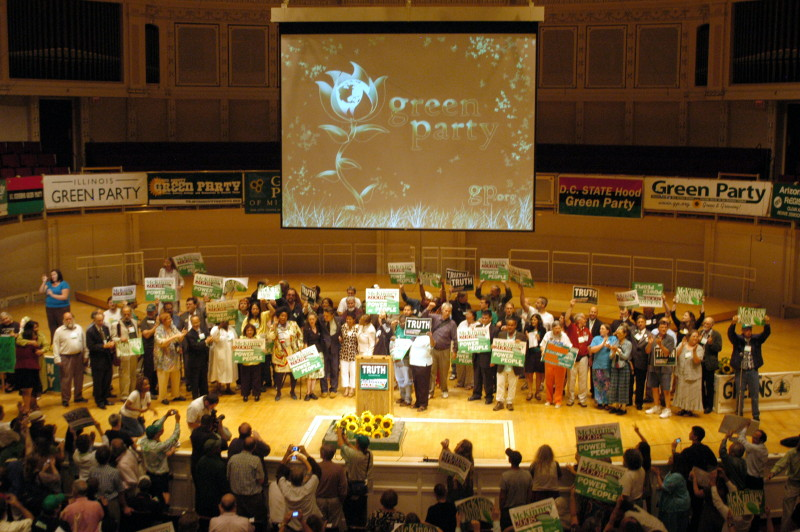
The 2008 Green Party National Convention held in Chicago. Various third parties also hold their own national conventions.

Each party sets its own rules for the participation and format of the convention. Broadly speaking, each U.S. state and territory party is apportioned a select number of voting representatives, individually known as delegates and collectively as the delegation. Each party uses its own formula for determining the size of each delegation, factoring in such considerations as population, proportion of that state's Congressional representatives or state government officials who are members of the party, and the state's voting patterns in previous presidential elections. The selection of individual delegates and their alternates, too, is governed by the bylaws of each state party, or in some cases by state law.

The 2004 Democratic National Convention counted 4,353 delegates and 611 alternates. The 2004 Republican National Convention had 2,509 delegates and 2,344 alternates. However, other attendees who do not participate in the formal business of the convention dwarf these individuals numerically. These include non-delegate party officials and activists, invited guests and companions, and international observers, not to mention numerous members of the news media, volunteers, protesters, and local business proprietors and promoters hoping to capitalize on the quadrennial event.

=== Location ===
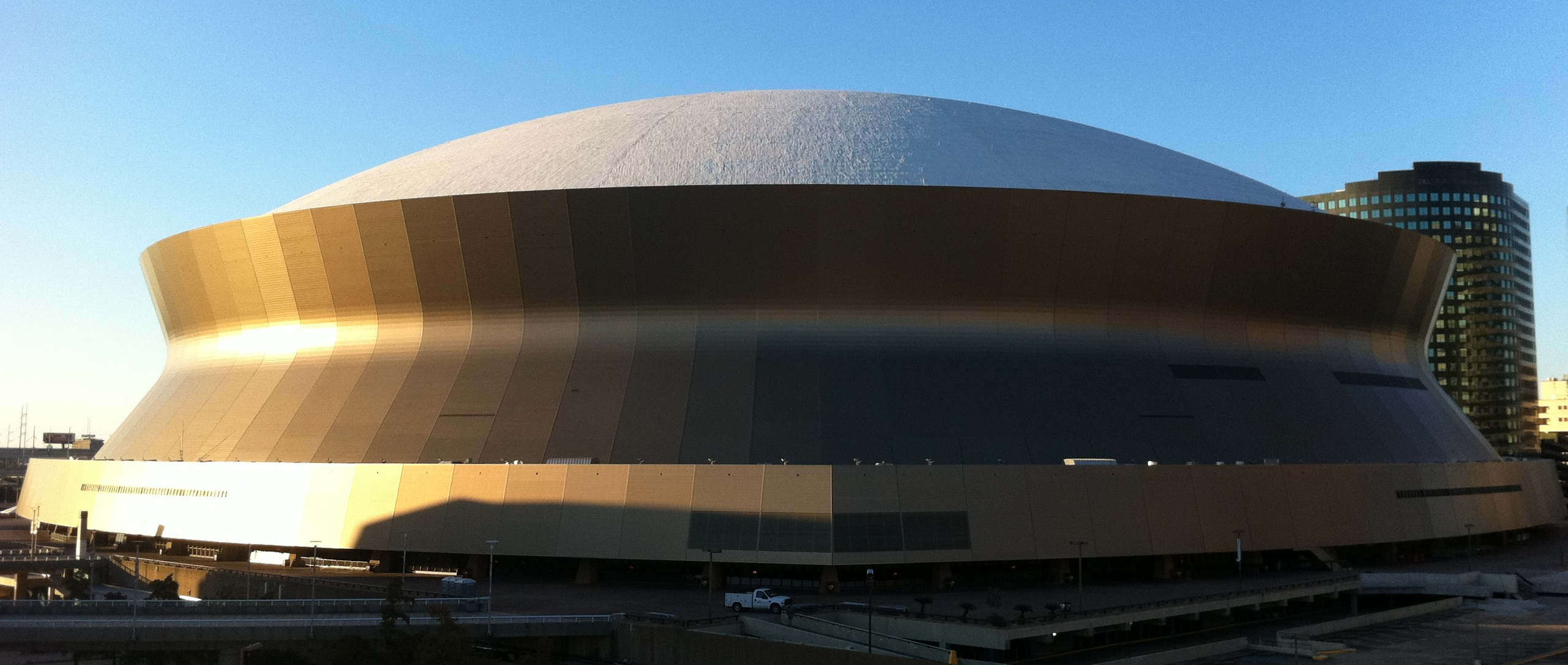
The Louisiana Superdome in New Orleans was the site of the 1988 Republican National Convention, which nominated George H.W. Bush and Dan Quayle for president and vice president. In recent decades, the two major parties have held their conventions at sports stadiums and arenas.

The convention is typically held in a major city selected by the national party organization 18–24 months before the election is to be held, although the Republican National Committee voted in 2022 to allow the party to select its presidential convention sites six years in advance, and they chose Houston as their host city in 2023. As the two major conventions have grown into large, publicized affairs with significant economic impact, cities today compete vigorously to be awarded host responsibilities, citing their meeting venues, lodging facilities, and entertainment as well as offering economic incentives.

The location of early conventions was dictated by the difficulty of transporting delegates from far-flung parts of the country; early Democratic and Whig Conventions were frequently held in the central Eastern Seaboard port of Baltimore, Maryland. As the U.S. expanded westward and railroads connected cities, Midwestern locations such as Chicago, Illinois—which since 1860 has held 26 Republican and Democratic Conventions combined, more than any other city—became the favored hosts. In addition St. Louis, Missouri, hosted Democratic national nominating conventions in 1876, 1888, 1904, and 1916, as well as the national Republican convention of 1896 and a national Populist convention in the same year. The city had easy railroad access, numerous elegant hotels and expansive meeting facilities, with Democrats wanting to meet close to their base in the "Solid South." But the ubiquity of air travel in the mid twentieth century eroded the advantage of the central location of midwestern cities, and the infamous protest activity and police response at the 1968 Democratic National Convention ended Chicago's hosting dominance, with the city only holding two conventions since.

Baltimore is an excellent example of the changing nature of convention host cities. The most frequent host city of major party conventions in the 19th century, Baltimore is currently considered to lack an appropriate venue and sufficient hotel space for modern conventions. When the city made a longshot bid for the 2004 Democratic National Convention, the city proposed hosting the convention underneath a temporary canopy that would be erected at Oriole Park at Camden Yards (which would have likely necessitated its baseball team tenant to vacate the venue for a roughly two-month period of their season).

In present times, political symbolism affects the selection of the host city as much as economic or logistical considerations do. A particular city might be selected to enhance the standing of a favorite son, or in an effort to curry favor with residents of that state. For example, in 2011, Obama campaign manager Jim Messina noted: "We put the Democratic National Convention in Charlotte, North Carolina in part because we believe so deeply in" a "New South map." Likewise, New York City was selected as the host of the 2004 Republican National Convention to evoke memories of George W. Bush's leadership during the September 11 attacks. Milwaukee, in the politically competitive state of Wisconsin, was chosen as the site of the 2020 Democratic National Convention (although due to COVID-19 it was essentially not held there), and the subsequent 2024 Republican National Convention.

The conventions historically have been held inside convention centers, but in recent decades the two major parties have favored sports arenas and stadiums to accommodate the increasing capacity, the former because indoor arenas are usually off-season outside of WNBA sites, allowing plenty of time for preparation (the major political parties have avoided baseball stadiums ever since the 1992 Republican National Convention at the Houston Astrodome forced the Houston Astros to play 26 consecutive road games). Bids for the 2008 Republican National Convention, for example, were required to have a facility with a seating capacity of at least 20,500 people, including a convention floor of about 5,500 delegates and alternates; the Xcel Energy Center in Saint Paul, Minnesota was eventually selected. Meanwhile, approximately 84,000 people attended the last day of the 2008 Democratic National Convention at Denver's Invesco Field at Mile High. The last day of the 2012 Democratic Convention originally also was scheduled for an outdoor football stadium, but was moved indoors due to weather concerns. Excepting the pandemic-affected 2020 conventions, the last non-sporting venue to host each convention was the 1984 Democratic National Convention at San Francisco's Moscone Center, and the 1996 Republican National Convention at the San Diego Convention Center.

On six occasions, both the Democratic and Republican parties held their conventions in the same city: Chicago four times, in 1884, 1932, 1944, and 1952; Philadelphia in 1948, and Miami Beach, the last to do so, in 1972.

== Delegate selection process ==
Every year of a presidential election, the United States' political parties have national conventions that result in presidential candidates. However, selected delegates from each state choose candidates rather than members of the public.

Including pledged delegates in the nomination process began after the Presidential election year of 1968, when there was widespread dissatisfaction with the presidential nominating process. Minor-party movements also threatened the chances of Democratic and Republican candidates to win majorities of the electoral votes, which resulted in the reformation of the presidential election process.

=== Democratic selection process ===
Each party and state has its own process to selecting delegates.

Generally speaking, delegates of both major parties usually pledge their votes to a specific candidate, and those who are associated with the Democratic Party and are unpledged are considered super delegates. These super delegates may include governors who identify with the party, members of the U.S. Congress, as well as members of the Democratic National Committee. Super Delegates aren't pledged to a particular candidate, and can vote for who they please. Any registered Democrat may run to be a delegate, and wins are based on congressional votes. Once Democrats choose their delegates, they distribute delegates to each candidate evenly, according to the number of congressional district votes they get (must be at least 15%).

=== Republican selection process ===
Rule 14 of the Republican Party's national rules determines the size of delegates for each state, territory, or political subdivision. Delegate selection for the Republican Party must take between March 1 and the second Saturday in June in the year that the convention is held (except for Iowa, New Hampshire, South Carolina, and Nevada, which are exempt from the rule and may hold earlier selection processes). The Republican Party uses a "Proportional Allocation" rule, which states that delegates should be based on the statewide votes or the number of congressional district votes in proportion to the number of votes received by each candidate. Also, each state must advocate to have an equal number of men and women in its delegation.

Delegates and alternate delegates for the Republican National Convention may be selected or bound by only one of the following:

- Primary election
- Republican State Committee
- State and Congressional district conventions
- Any method that stays consistent with the rules by which they were selected

== Favorite son, dark horse, bolter ==
=== Favorite son ===
A powerful state politician, typically the governor or senator, can set up as a "favorite son". The state delegates are pledged to vote for him at least for the first round. Today the role is honorific, but before 1972 control of a delegation gave bargaining power regarding the platform or the nomination. The technique was widely used in the 19th and early 20th centuries. Since nationwide campaigns by candidates and binding primary elections have replaced brokered conventions, the technique has fallen out of use, as party rule changes in the early 1970s required candidates to have nominations from more than one state.

In 1860, Senator Robert M. T. Hunter was Virginia's favorite at the Democratic Party convention. He offered a pro-slavery voice of moderation amidst the strident rise of secession. In 1952, California Governor Earl Warren was the favorite son at the Republican convention, but he was challenged by Senator Richard Nixon. Nixon leveraged his way into becoming Eisenhower's choice for the vice presidential nomination.

=== Dark horse ===
The term "dark horse candidate" was used at the 1844 Democratic National Convention, at which little-known Tennessee politician James K. Polk emerged as the candidate after the failure of the leading candidates to secure the necessary two-thirds majority. Other successful dark horse candidates include:

- Franklin Pierce, the Democratic nominee, elected in 1852.
- Rutherford B. Hayes, elected in 1876.
- James A. Garfield, elected in 1880.
- Warren G. Harding, elected president in 1920 after his surprise Republican nomination.
- Wendell Willkie, a businessman who came out of nowhere to win the Republican nomination in 1940. He lost to President Franklin Roosevelt.

=== Bolter ===
Delegates to the convention are expected to support whichever candidate wins the nomination. A delegate who refuses to do so and walks out, or bolts, sometimes in public fashion, can be referred to as a bolter. A group of bolters may form an alternate convention that can be called a bolting convention; the remnants of the party or convention they leave behind can be called a rump convention.

At the intensely fought 1896 Republican convention, the decisive battle was on support for gold or silver. When gold forces won by tally of 812 to 110, 25 of the 110 bolted while the others supported the party nominee, William McKinley. The next day the bolters formed a new political party, dubbed the Silver Republican Party. It had a strong base of support in the silver-mining Mountain states. The Democratic nominee, William Jennings Bryan, appealed to the bolters by accepting the Silver Republican nomination; he also accepted the People's party nomination, so he ran on three tickets.

Conservative Democrats from the South bolted from the 1948 Democratic Convention to form the States' Rights Party under the banner of Strom Thurmond when Minneapolis Mayor Hubert Humphrey successfully added a civil rights plank to the Democratic platform.

The most notorious instance of bolting was in 1912 when, having lost a credentials fight, the supporters of former President Theodore Roosevelt formed the so-called Bull Moose Party, splitting the GOP down the middle, holding a bolting convention to nominate Roosevelt who came in second in the election, something that would never happen again.

== Proceedings ==
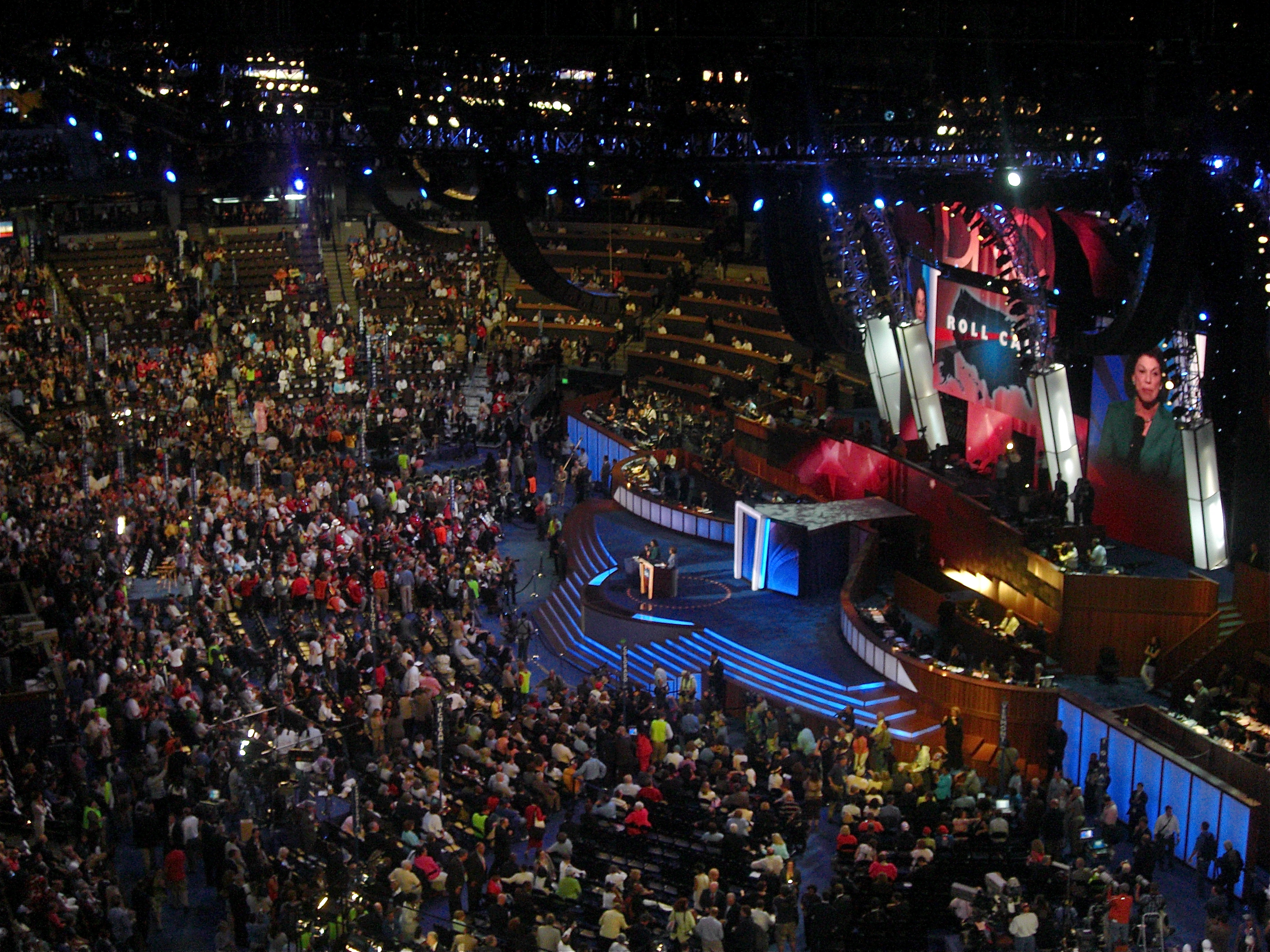
Roll call of states during the 2008 Democratic National Convention at the Pepsi Center in Denver, Colorado

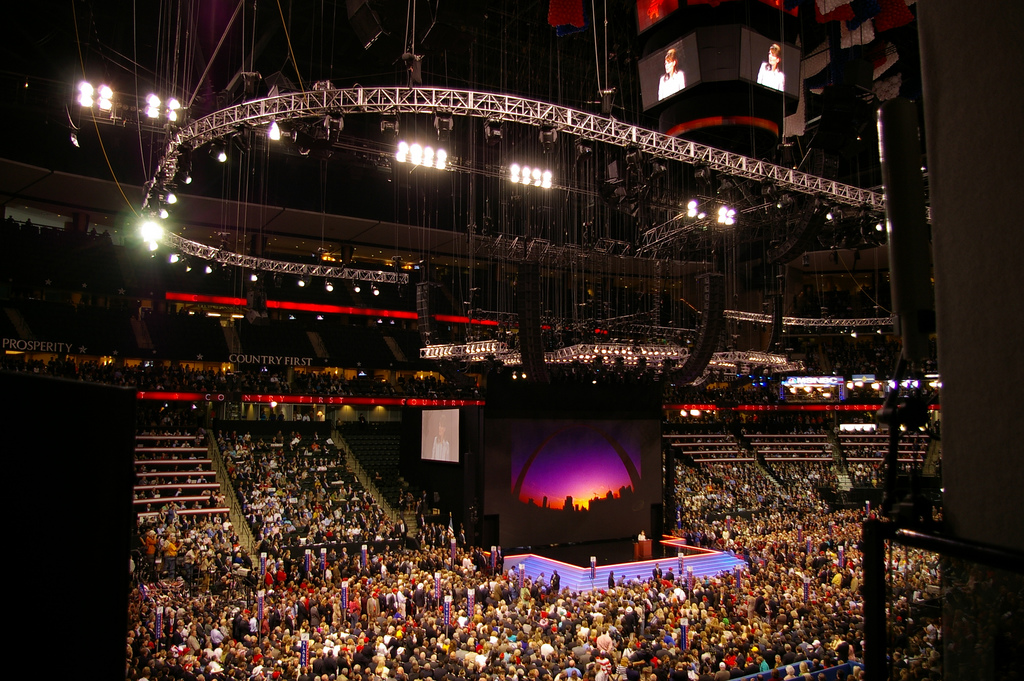
The floor of the 2008 Republican National Convention at the Xcel Energy Center in Saint Paul, Minnesota

During the day, party activists hold meetings and rallies, and work on the platform. Voting and important convention-wide addresses usually take place in the evening hours.

In recent conventions, routine business such as examining the credentials of delegations, ratifying rules and procedures, election of convention officers, and adoption of the platform usually take up the business of the first two days of the convention. Balloting was usually held on the third day, with the nomination and acceptance made on the last day, but even some of these traditions have fallen away in 21st-century conventions. The only constant is that the convention ends with the nominee's acceptance speech.

=== Platform ===
Each convention produces a statement of principles known as its platform, containing goals and proposals known as planks. Relatively little of a party platform is even proposed as public policy. Much of the language is generic, while other sections are narrowly written to appeal to factions or interest groups within the party. Unlike electoral manifestos in many European countries, the platform is not binding on either the party or the candidate.

Because it is ideological rather than pragmatic, however, the platform is sometimes itself politicized. For example, defenders of abortion rights lobbied heavily to remove the Human Life Amendment plank from the 1996 Republican National Convention platform, a move fiercely resisted by conservatives despite the fact that no such amendment had ever come up for debate.

=== Voting ===
Since the 1970s, voting has for the most part been perfunctory; the selection of the major parties' nominees have rarely been in doubt, so a single ballot has always been sufficient. Each delegation announces its vote tallies, usually accompanied with some boosterism of their state or territory. The delegation may pass, nominally to re-tally their delegates' preferences, but often to allow a different delegation to give the leading candidate the honor of casting the majority-making vote.

Before the presidential nomination season actually begins, there is often speculation about whether a single front runner would emerge. If there is no single candidate receiving a majority of delegates at the end of the primary season, a scenario called a brokered convention would result, where a candidate would be selected either at or near the convention, through political horse-trading and lesser candidates compelling their delegates to vote for one of the front runners. The best example was the 1924 Democratic Convention, which took 103 ballots. The situation is more likely to occur in the Democratic Party, because of its proportional representation system, but such a scenario has been the subject of speculation with regard to most contested nominations of both parties without actually coming to pass in recent years. It is a common scenario in fiction, most recently in an episode of The West Wing. The closest to a brokered convention in recent years was at the 1976 Republican National Convention, when neither Gerald Ford nor Ronald Reagan received enough votes in the primary to lock up the nomination. Since then, candidates have received enough momentum to reach a majority through pledged and bound delegates before the date of the convention.

More recently, a customary practice has been for the losing candidates in the primary season to release their delegates and exhort them to vote for the winning nominee as a sign of party unity. Thus, the vote tallied on the floor is unanimous or nearly so. Some delegates may nevertheless choose to vote for their candidate. And in 2008 both happened: Hillary Clinton received over 1,000 votes before she herself moved to nominate Barack Obama by acclamation, officially making it a unanimous vote.

The voting method at the conventions is a "roll call of the states", which include territories such as Washington D.C., American Samoa, Guam, Puerto Rico, the U.S. Virgin Islands, and a catch-all "delegates abroad" category. The states are called in alphabetical order (beginning with Alabama and ending with Wyoming). The state's spokesperson (who generally begins with glowing comments about the state's history, geography, and notable party elected officials) can either choose to announce its delegate count or pass. Once all states have either declared or passed, those states which passed are called upon again to announce their delegate count. (Generally, a decision is made beforehand that some states will pass in the first round, to allow a particular state—generally either the presidential or vice-presidential nominee's home state—to be the one whose delegate count pushes the candidate "over the top", thus securing the nomination.)

Vice-presidential voting has been problematic since the beginning: at the 1972 Democratic National Convention, the vote was scattered between 50 candidates and at the 1976 Republican National Convention, the vote was also scattered widely. In 1988, both parties decided to have their designated candidates nominated by suspending the rules and declaring them nominated by acclamation; the most recent vice-presidential roll call vote was at the 1984 Republican National Convention.

If, after the first round of voting, there is no candidate with a majority of votes, subsequent roll calls are held. In between, candidates can make backroom deals, swapping delegates in exchange for positions in the administration or other favors, or candidates can release their delegates to vote for whoever they personally prefer. Roll calls continue until one candidate has a majority: the 1924 Democratic National Convention holds the record as the longest ever, as divisions within the party concerning Prohibition led to 102 ballots between Alfred E. Smith and William G. McAdoo, before the relatively unknown John W. Davis was chosen as a compromise candidate on the 103rd ballot.

=== Speeches ===
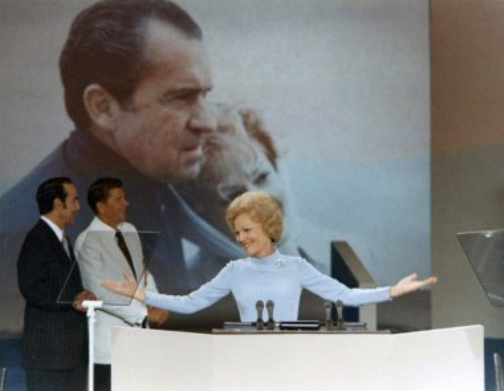
First Lady Pat Nixon being honored at the 1972 Republican National Convention

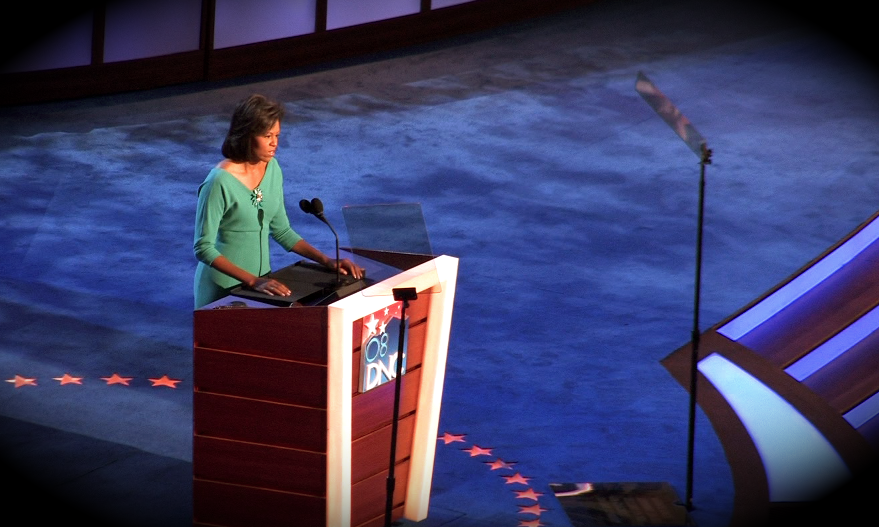
Michelle Obama speaking at the 2008 Democratic National Convention

Minor figures in the party are given the opportunity to address the floor of the convention during the daytime, when only the small audiences of C-SPAN and other cable television outlets are watching. The evening's speeches—designed for broadcast to a large national audience—are reserved for major speeches by notable, respected public figures; the speakers at the 2004 Democratic Convention included Ted Kennedy, a forty-two-year veteran of the United States Senate, and Jimmy Carter, a former Democratic President, while speakers at the Republican Convention included Governor Arnold Schwarzenegger of California and Governor George Pataki of New York, two of the largest states in the nation.

The organizers of the convention may designate one of these speeches as the keynote address, one which above all others is stated to underscore the convention's themes or political goals. For instance, the 1992 Democratic National Convention keynote address was delivered by Georgia Governor Zell Miller, whose stories of an impoverished childhood echoed the economic themes of the nominee, Arkansas Governor Bill Clinton. The 1996 Republican National Convention was keynoted by U.S. Representative Susan Molinari of New York, intended to reassure political moderates about the centrism of the nominee, former Senator Bob Dole. And the 2004 Democratic National Convention featured Senator Barack Obama, whose speech brought the future President national recognition for the first time.

Uniquely, Miller, by then a Senator, would also be the keynote speaker at the 2004 Republican Convention, despite still maintaining his Democratic registration.

The final day of the convention usually features the formal acceptance speeches from the nominees for president and vice president. Despite recent controversy maintaining that recent conventions were scripted from beginning to end, and that very little news (if any) comes out of the convention, the acceptance speech has always been televised by the networks, because it receives the highest ratings of the convention. In addition, the halls of the convention are packed at this time, with many party loyalists sneaking in. Afterwards, balloons are usually dropped and the delegates celebrate the nomination.

== Presidential primary history ==
The history of conventions in the United States is driven by the history of presidential primaries in the United States. In the first two presidential elections, the Electoral College handled the nominations and elections in 1789 and 1792 that selected George Washington, so no conventions were needed.

But as political parties were created, starting with the 1796 election, congressional party or a state legislature party caucus selected the party's presidential candidates. That system collapsed in 1824, and since 1832 the preferred mechanism for nomination has been a national convention. Delegates to the national convention were usually selected at state conventions whose own delegates were chosen by district conventions. Sometimes they were dominated by intrigue between political bosses who controlled delegates; the national convention was far from democratic or transparent.

Progressive Era reformers then looked to the primary election as a way to measure popular opinion of candidates, as opposed to the opinion of the bosses. Florida enacted the first presidential primary in 1901. The Wisconsin direct open primary of 1905 was the first to eliminate the caucus and mandate direct selection of national convention delegates. In 1910, Oregon became the first state to establish a presidential preference primary, which requires delegates to the National Convention to support the winner of the primary at the convention. The impetus for national adoption of the binding primary election was the 1968 Democratic National Convention. Vice President Hubert Humphrey secured the presidential nomination despite not winning a single primary under his own name. After this, a Democratic National Committee-commissioned panel led by Senator George McGovern – the McGovern–Fraser Commission – recommended that states adopt new rules to assure wider participation. A large number of states, faced with the need to conform to more detailed rules for the selection of national delegates in 1972, chose a presidential primary as an easier way to come into compliance with the new national Democratic Party rules. The result was that many more future delegates would be selected by a state presidential primary. The Republicans also adopted many more state presidential primaries.

== Convention history ==
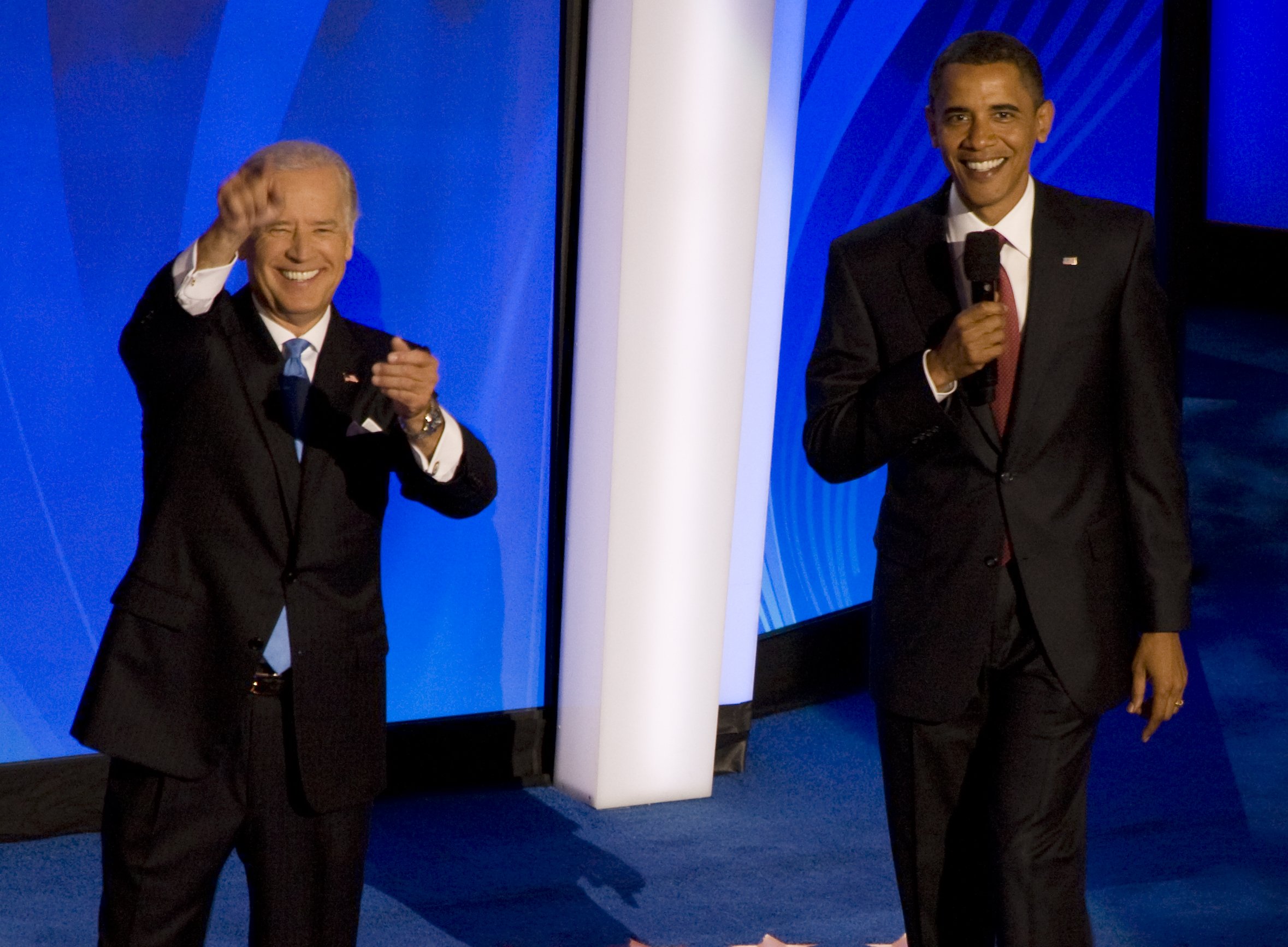
Barack Obama and Joe Biden appear together at the 2008 Democratic National Convention.

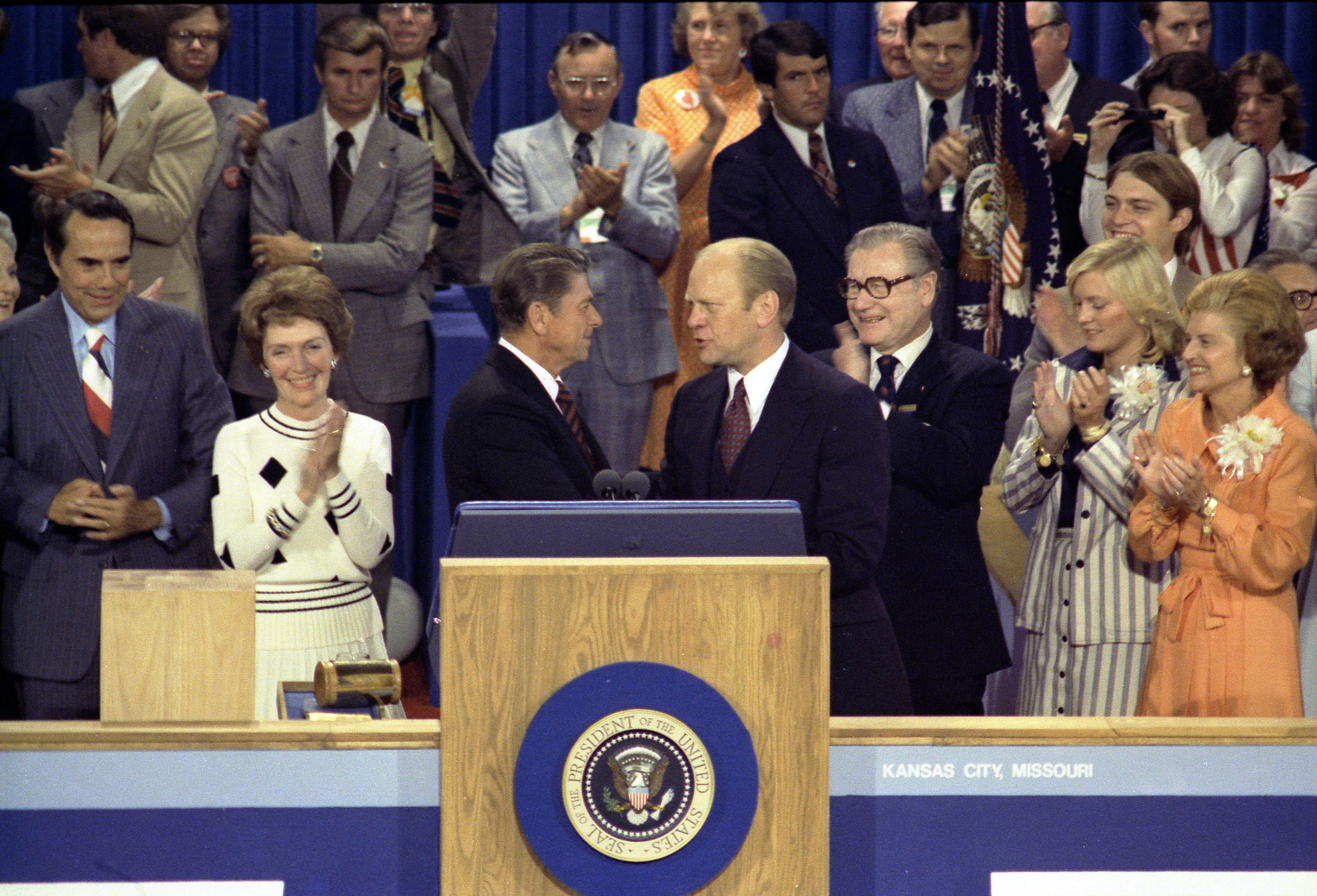
Primary foes Ronald Reagan (left) and Gerald Ford (right) shake hands during the 1976 Republican National Convention, the last major party convention whose outcome was in doubt.

=== First conventions ===
The Federalist Party invented the first national conventions in 1808 and 1812 when they held secret national meetings to pick their candidates. The Democratic-Republican Party never used conventions. Instead its members of Congress met in party caucuses to select the nominee. Regional conflicts erupted in the hotly contested 1824 election, in which factions of the Democratic-Republican Party outright rejected taking part in the caucus because of its little, heavily dwindling participation and in their view undemocratic character, rejected the eventual caucus nominee, William H. Crawford of Georgia, and backed three regional candidates, nominated by state legislatures, John Quincy Adams of Massachusetts, Henry Clay of Kentucky, and Andrew Jackson of Tennessee (all of whom carried more states than Crawford in the election) instead.

In 1831 the Anti-Masonic Party convened in Baltimore, Maryland to select a single presidential candidate agreeable to the whole party leadership in the 1832 presidential election. The National Republican and Democratic parties soon followed suit.

==== Civil War era conventions ====
The new Republican party held their first convention in 1856.

In 1860, Abraham Lincoln was nominated by the Republicans. The Democratic Party convention nominated Stephen A. Douglas: however, after Southern delegates walked out of or boycotted the convention, they held their own convention and nominated John C. Breckinridge.

During the Civil War, the 1864 Republican convention was rebranded as the National Union Convention, since it included Democrats who remained loyal to the Union.

=== Late 1800s ===
==== 1872 Democrats ====
The Democrats held a very short 1872 Democratic National Convention which endorsed the nominee of the 1872 Liberal Republican convention. The Liberal Republicans were bitterly opposed to incumbent Republican Ulysses S. Grant, and bolted to form their own party. They nominated Horace Greeley, who lost to Grant in a landslide, and the new party soon collapsed.

==== 1884 Republicans ====
In the run-up to the 1884 GOP convention, reformers called "Mugwumps" organized their forces in the swing states, especially New York and Massachusetts. They failed to block James G. Blaine, and many bolted to the Democrats, who had nominated reformer Grover Cleveland. Young Theodore Roosevelt and Henry Cabot Lodge, leading reformers, refused to bolt—an action that preserved their leadership role in the GOP.

=== 1900s ===
Conventions were often heated affairs, playing a vital role in deciding each party's nominee. The process remained far from democratic or transparent, however. The party convention was a scene of intrigue among political bosses, who largely appointed and otherwise controlled for the most part nearly all of the delegates.

==== 1912 Republicans ====
Entering the convention, the forces of President Taft and ex-president Roosevelt seemed evenly matched. Taft had better planning, better organizers, and more top convention officials. The camps engaged in a fight for the delegations, with Taft emerging victorious, and Roosevelt claiming that several delegations were fraudulently seated because of the machinations of conservative party leaders including William Barnes Jr. and Boies Penrose. Following the seating of the anti-Roosevelt delegations, California Governor Hiram Johnson proclaimed that progressives would form a new party to nominate Roosevelt. Though many of Roosevelt's delegates remained at the convention, most refused to take part in the presidential ballot in protest of the contested delegates. Roosevelt ultimately ran a third party campaign as part of the Progressive Party (nicknamed the "Bull Moose Party"). Taft and Roosevelt both lost the 1912 election to the Democratic nominee, Woodrow Wilson.

==== 1924 Democrats ====
The party was deeply factionalized along regional and cultural lines, with two powerful factions: a rural/Protestant/Southern faction led by William McAdoo, and an urban/Catholic/machine element represented by New York Governor Al Smith. The second Ku Klux Klan was flourishing nationwide, although no nationally prominent Democrat acknowledged membership, and the factions battled over a resolution to condemn the KKK. No compromises seemed possible as the convention dragged on for 17 days, with the balloting for presidential candidate being deadlocked for 103 ballots until dark horse John W. Davis, a neutral figure, was nominated.

Naming the younger brother of William Jennings Bryan as running mate was a sop to the rural faction. Oklahoma was a representative border state, with the delegation deeply divided on the KKK issue.

Until the late 1960s, most delegates in presidential nominating conventions were appointed by political bosses or "kingmakers", "party regulars...who had the most say in picking a candidate."

==== 1968 Democrats ====
The Vietnam War energized a large number of supporters of anti-war Senator Eugene McCarthy of Minnesota, but they had no say in the matter. Vice President Hubert Humphrey—associated with the increasingly unpopular administration of Lyndon B. Johnson—did not compete in a single primary, yet controlled enough delegates to secure the Democratic nomination. This proved one of several factors behind rioting which broke out at the Democratic convention in Chicago.

==== Switch to primary system ====
A few, mostly western, states adopted primary elections in the late 19th century and during the Progressive Era, but the catalyst for their widespread adoption came during the election of 1968. Media images of the event—angry mobs facing down police—damaged the image of the Democratic Party, which appointed a commission headed by South Dakota Senator George McGovern to select a new, less controversial method of choosing nominees. The McGovern–Fraser Commission settled on the primary election, adopted by the Democratic National Committee in 1968. The Republicans adopted the primary as their preferred method in 1972. Henceforth, candidates would be given convention delegates based on their performance in primaries, and these delegates were bound to vote for their candidate. As a result, the major party presidential nominating convention has lost almost all of its old drama. The last attempt to release delegates from their candidates came at the 1980 Democratic National Convention, when Senator Ted Kennedy of Massachusetts sought votes of delegates held by incumbent President Jimmy Carter. The last major party convention whose outcome was in doubt was the 1976 Republican National Convention, when former California Governor Ronald Reagan nearly won the nomination away from the incumbent president, Gerald Ford.

==== Television coverage ====
While rank and file members had no input in early nominations, they were still drawn by the aura of mystery surrounding the convention, and networks began to broadcast speeches and debates to the general public. The 1924 Republican convention was the first broadcast on radio, and NBC affiliate W2XBS in New York City made the first telecast of a national party convention, of the 1940 Republican National Convention in Philadelphia, and the other two of the Big Three television networks soon followed. NBC News anchorman John Chancellor said just before the start of the 1972 Democratic National Convention, "Convention coverage is the most important thing we do. The conventions are not just political theater, but really serious stuff, and that's why all the networks have an obligation to give gavel-to-gavel coverage. It's a time when we all ought to be doing our duty."

The 1952 presidential conventions were the first to be televised nationally.

The presence of journalists at presidential nominating conventions have increased with the television networks. In 1976, the Democratic Convention consisted of 3,381 delegates and 11,500 reporters, broadcasters, editors and camera operators. This is on par with the increase in the number of televisions in American homes. In 1960, 87 percent of people had a television; by 1976, 98 percent did. By the 1992 conventions, network coverage increased from three networks (NBC, ABC and CBS) to five networks (NBC, ABC, CBS, Fox and PBS). At the 1996 Republican National Convention there were approximately seven journalists per one delegate, or about 15,000 journalists.

The increase of the media at these conventions originally led to a growth in the public's interest in elections. Voter turnout in the primaries increased from fewer than five million voters in 1948 to around thirteen million in 1952. By broadcasting the conventions on the television, people were more connected to the suspense and the decisions being made, therefore making them more politically aware, and more educated voters. When scholars studied the 1976 conventions they determined that by watching nomination conventions, even viewers that were not previously very politically active developed a much stronger interest in the election process and the candidate.

==== 1976 Republicans ====
Going into the 1976 GOP Convention, President Gerald Ford had won more primary delegates than California Governor Ronald Reagan. However, Ford did not have enough delegates to secure the nomination, and as the convention opened both candidates were seen as still having a chance to win. Because of this, both Ford and Reagan arrived in Kansas City before the convention opened to woo the remaining uncommitted delegates in an effort to secure the nomination.

Reagan had promised, if nominated, to name Senator Richard Schweiker of Pennsylvania as his running mate, in a bid to attract liberals and centrists in the party. The key vote of the convention occurred when Reagan's managers proposed a rules change that would have required Ford to publicly announce his running mate before the presidential balloting. Reagan's managers hoped that when Ford announced his choice for vice president, it would anger one of the two factions of the party and thus help Reagan. The proposed rules change was defeated, and Ford gained the momentum he needed to win the nomination.

This is considered the last convention where the nominee was in doubt at the beginning of the convention.

And not coincidentally, the Democratic 1976 convention was the last convention where the vice-presidential nominee was announced during the convention, after the presidential nominee was chosen. In recent years, once the presidential nominee is obvious, the choice of the vice-presidential nominee has become a major publicity event in the leadup to the convention.

==== Decrease in importance ====
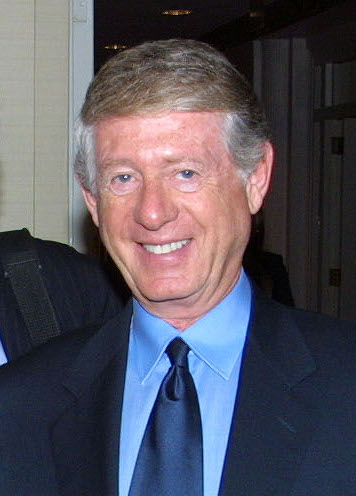
News anchor Ted Koppel (pictured in 2002), who midway through the 1996 Republican National Convention told viewers that he was going home because it has become "more of an infomercial than a news event"

With the rise of the direct primary, and in particular with states moving earlier and earlier in the primary calendar since the 1988 election, the nominee has often secured a commanding majority of delegates far in advance of the convention. As such, any actual business conducted at the major parties' conventions (such as the roll call of delegates) have largely become a formality, and the main focus is on promoting and celebrating the nominee and the party platform to a wider audience. It also has been described as a televised roast session for the opposing party's nominee. For instance, speeches by noted and popular party figures are scheduled for the coveted primetime hours, when most people would be watching.

At the 1996 Republican National Convention, media outlets observed that the convention had become tightly-choreographed with television viewership in mind, including non-keynote speakers being limited to five minutes each, the use of video packages, and the schedule taking considerations for commercial breaks. RNC chairman Haley Barbour stated that they wanted the convention to be "fast-paced and entertaining", and use video to impart their messaging "more clearly and more efficiently." The RNC also purchased time-brokered blocks on the cable network The Family Channel (then-owned by televangelist Pat Robertson, a Republican Party supporter) to air commercial-free coverage of the entire convention. ABC News Nightline host Ted Koppel abruptly ended his coverage of the 1996 conventions, arguing that the events had effectively become an "infomercial" for the party's nominee rather than a bona fide news event.

In 2020, political historian Michael Barone argued in an op-ed that the advents of direct distance dialing and television had made the original purposes of the conventions—being "the only place and time where party politicians could communicate frankly and bargain personally", and "discover which candidates had genuine support and which just gave lip service"–increasingly redundant, and that the events had become largely "choreographed" celebrations of the party nominee.

The changing nature of the conventions, as well as overall changes in television viewing habits, have changed how broadcasters cover the conventions. Coverage of the conventions is now typically relegated to news channels, C-SPAN, and streaming outlets; by 2012, the major networks usually only provided an hour of coverage per-night, focusing on the headlining speakers. PBS continues to provide full primetime coverage of the conventions, although it breaks away from minor speakers and mundane business for analysis and discussion.

=== 2000s ===
==== COVID-19 affected 2020 conventions ====
The COVID-19 pandemic in 2020 forced both major and third parties to modify the format of their conventions to comply with social distancing and restrictions on public gatherings. The Democratic convention was conducted as a virtual event with all speakers appearing from remote locations, and no in-person gatherings of delegates. To fulfill the host city contract with Milwaukee, the event's production was conducted from the Wisconsin Center. The acceptance speeches of Joe Biden and Kamala Harris were held at the Chase Center on the Riverfront in Biden's hometown of Wilmington, Delaware.

Donald Trump repeatedly pushed for the Republican convention to be held in-person as normal. The event was originally scheduled for Spectrum Center in Charlotte; after North Carolina's Democratic governor Roy Cooper refused to allow it to be held at full scale or without mandatory masking or social distancing, the RNC announced plans to move most of the in-person events to Jacksonville, Florida, but still conduct the official business from Charlotte. However, after Jacksonville enacted similar restrictions, and amid nationwide increases in cases, Trump announced in July 2020 that the events in Jacksonville had been called off.

As with the Democratic convention, the Republican convention was conducted in a downsized form. To fulfill the host city contract with Charlotte, a program of official business was conducted in-person on August 24 with a smaller contingent of 336 delegates, including the roll call. The remainder of the event consisted of primetime programs of pre-recorded speeches, filmed mainly at the Andrew W. Mellon Auditorium in Washington, D.C. The speeches by Vice President Pence (from Fort McHenry in Baltimore), and by First Lady Melania Trump and President Trump (from the White House Rose Garden), were conducted live and in-person with audiences of supporters; CDC-recommended mitigations were largely ignored.

==== 2024 conventions ====
The 2024 Republican National Convention was held in Milwaukee, with the city's selection in the swing state of Wisconsin making a political point after the Democrats were unable to hold a full convention there in 2020 due to COVID-19.

The 2024 Democratic National Convention, held from August 19 to 22, returned to an in-person event, but the roll call was still held as a virtual vote in early August to comply with Ohio's ballot deadline, as the state was unable to sufficiently move its ballot deadline from August 7 to accommodate the scheduling of the DNC; the new law did not take effect until September 1.

==== 2028 conventions ====
The Republicans chose Houston as their convention site for 2028 in 2023. This was preceded by a 2022 GOP rules change in 2022 that authorized committee members to pick a convention city over six years out. This was done five years before the convention date, likely the earliest a major party convention location has ever been chosen. Following normal precedent, the Democrats are likely to choose their 2028 convention city in 2026 or 2027. It was announced in August, 2026, that three cities were named as finalists: Boston, Denver, and Philadelphia, which together hosted three of the four Democratic conventions from 2004 through 2016,

== Midterm conventions ==
The two parties have occasionally held Midterm conventions, or conferences. The Democrats have held three midterm conferences, in 1974, 1978 and 1982. The Republicans have held one midterm convention, in 2026.

== In popular culture ==
=== Film / Television (real conventions, chronological by convention year) ===
- Death by Lightning, a 2025 mini-series about the assassination of James Garfield, with much of the first episode taking place at the brokered 1880 Republican Convention.
- American Revolution 2, a 1969 documentary on protesters at the 1968 Democratic Convention.
- Medium Cool, a 1969 film combining fictional and non-fictional content which follows a cameraman covering the 1968 Democratic Convention.
- Prologue, a 1970 Canadian film combining fictional and non-fictional content which follows a journalist covering the 1968 Democratic Convention.
- Born on the Fourth of July, a 1989 biopic of Ron Kovic, with dramatized scenes at both the 1972 Republican Convention and 1976 Democratic Convention
- Conventioneers, a 2005 rom-com about a Republican delegate and a Democrat protesting the 2004 Republican Convention.
- Convention, a 2009 documentary about the 2008 Democratic Convention.
- The Last Party, a 2013 documentary by Robert Downey Jr. about both 2012 Conventions.

=== Film / Television (fictional conventions, alphabetical) ===
- The Best Man, a 1964 film based on a play of the same name, centering on the actions of two presidential candidates vying for an unspecified political party's nomination leading up to and during a brokered convention.
- House of Cards, the U.S. TV series, with two episodes of the fourth season centering on an open Democratic National Convention where the vice-presidential nomination is contested.
- The Man, a 1972 political thriller, based on a book of the same name, about the first black president, which concludes at a convention.
- The Manchurian Candidate, a 1962 thriller, based on a book of the same name, culminating in an attempted assassination at a fictional convention at Madison Square Garden.
- Three Dark Horses, a 1952 Three Stooges short where the stooges go from janitors to delegates.
- Veep, where in the final season the title character wins the nomination at a brokered convention.
- The West Wing, where the final two episodes of season six center on a brokered convention for the presidential nomination.

=== Music ===
- Chicago, a 1971 song by the English singer-songwriter Graham Nash, which refers to anti-Vietnam War protests that took place during the 1968 Democratic Convention in Chicago and the subsequent trial of the Chicago Eight.
- Convention '72, a novelty "break-in" song by The Delegates.
- Billionaire, a 2010 song by the rapper Travie McCoy, with the lyrics "I'll be playin' basketball with the president, dunkin' on his delegates", a figurative reference to Barack Obama and the 2008 Democratic National Convention.

== See also ==
- Speeches by spouses of nominees at United States presidential nominating conventions
- List of Democratic National Conventions
- List of Republican National Conventions
- List of Whig National Conventions
- Libertarian National Convention
- Green National Convention
- Constitution Party National Convention
- National conventions of the Communist Party USA
