= List of presidential trips made by Jimmy Carter (1978) =

This is a list of presidential trips made by Jimmy Carter during 1978, the second year of his presidency as the 39th president of the United States. International trips are highlighted in blue.

This list excludes trips made within Washington, D.C., the U.S. federal capital in which the White House, the official residence and principal workplace of the president, is located. It also excludes the capital's immediate surroundings in Maryland and Virginia, such as Andrews Air Force Base in Maryland, where the president typically boards Air Force One for all trips outside the area. Also excluded are trips to Camp David, the country residence of the president, and to Carter's house in Plains, Georgia.

== January ==
State or country	Areas visited	Dates	Details
Iran	Tehran	January 1	Official visit. Met with Shah Mohammad Reza Pahlavi and King Hussein of Jordan.
India	New Delhi, Daulatpur Nasirabad	January 1–3	Met with President Neelam Sanjiva Reddy and Prime Minister Morarji Desai. Addressed Parliament of India.
Saudi Arabia	Riyadh	January 3–4	Met with King Khalid and Crown Prince Fahd.
Egypt	Aswan	January 4	Met with President Anwar Sadat and German Chancellor Helmut Schmidt.
France	Paris, Normandy, Bayeux, Versailles	January 4–6	Met with President Valéry Giscard d'Estaing and Prime Minister Raymond Barre.
Belgium	Brussels	January 6	Met with King Baudouin and Prime Minister Leo Tindemans. Attended meetings of the Commission of the European Communities and the North Atlantic Council.
Minnesota	St. Paul	January 16	Attended the funeral of former vice president Hubert H. Humphrey at House of Hope Presbyterian Church.
Georgia	Atlanta, St. Simons Island	January 20–21	Attended a "Southern Salute to the President" dinner, marking the first anniversary of his inauguration, at the Georgia World Congress Center. Stayed overnight at the Musgrove Plantation on St. Simons Island.

== February ==
State or country	Areas visited	Dates	Details
Rhode Island	Providence, Cranston	February 17	Toured the Rhode Island Group Health Association facility. Campaigned for Senator Claiborne Pell at the Cranston Hilton.
Maine	Orono, Bangor	February 17–18	Campaigned for Senator William Hathaway at the Penobscot Valley Country Club. Held a townhall meeting at Bangor Auditorium. Stayed at the home of Penobscot County Democratic Executive Committee chair Robert Murray. Attended a Maine Democratic Party fundraiser at the Husson College cafeteria.
New Hampshire	Nashua	February 18	Held a townhall meeting at the Nashua Senior High School gymnasium.
Delaware	Wilmington	February 20	Campaigned for Senator and future president Joe Biden at the Hotel duPont. Attended a Delaware Democratic Party fundraiser at Padua Academy.

== March ==
State or country	Areas visited	Dates	Details
North Carolina	Winston-Salem	March 17	Gave an address on national defense policy at Wake Forest University's Wait Chapel.
Georgia	Savannah, St. Simons Island	March 17–20	Visited the USS Dwight D. Eisenhower off the coast of Savannah. Addressed the Hibernian Society dinner at Savannah Civic Center. Vacationed at the Musgrove Plantation on St. Simons Island.
Venezuela	Caracas	March 28–29	Met with President Carlos Andrés Pérez. Addressed Congress and signed maritime boundary agreement.
Brazil	Brasília; Rio de Janeiro	March 29–31	Official visit. Met with President Ernesto Geisel and addressed National Congress.
Nigeria	Lagos	March 31–April 3	State visit. Met with President Olusegun Obasanjo.

== April ==
State or country	Areas visited	Dates	Details
Liberia	Monrovia	April 3	Met with President William R. Tolbert, Jr.

== May ==
State or country	Areas visited	Dates	Details
Colorado	Golden, Denver	May 3	Toured the Solar Energy Research Institute. Campaigned for Senator Floyd Haskell at the Currigan Exhibition Center. Stayed at the Cosmopolitan Hotel. Attended an interfaith prayer breakfast at the Currigan Exhibition Center. Met with volunteers for local environmental organizations at the Cosmopolitan Hotel.
California	Los Angeles	May 4	Addressed the Los Angeles County Bar Association 100th anniversary luncheon at the Dorothy Chandler Pavilion. Toured the Watts Labor Community Action Committee Senior Citizens Nutrition Center.
Oregon	Portland	May 4	Held a press conference at the Hilton Portland Hotel. Stayed at the home of local residents Paul and Janet Olson. Met with local officials at the Benson Hotel.
Washington	Spokane	May 5	Dedicated Riverfront Park, which had been redeveloped after its use as the site of Expo '74. Held a townhall meeting at the Spokane Convention Center.
Tennessee	Knoxville, Oak Ridge	May 22	Addressed Tennessee Valley Authority employees at Knoxville Civic Center. Toured Oak Ridge National Laboratory.
Illinois	Chicago, Elmhurst, Springfield	May 25–26	Campaigned for Alex Seith for Senate at The Blackstone Hotel. Attended a Cook County Democratic Party dinner at The Conrad Hilton. Stayed at the home of James M. Wall in Elmhurst. Addressed a joint session of the Illinois General Assembly at the Illinois State Capitol. Campaigned for Michael Bakalis for governor at the Holiday Inn East in Springfield.
West Virginia	Charleston	May 26	Campaigned for Senator Jennings Randolph in the Charleston Civic Center's West Virginia Room. Announced the establishment of the President's Commission on the Coal Industry at the Civic Center's Little Theater.

== June ==
State or country	Areas visited	Dates	Details
Maryland	Annapolis	June 7	Gave the commencement address at the United States Naval Academy's Navy–Marine Corps Memorial Stadium.
Georgia	Atlanta	June 16	Addressed the Southern Baptist Convention National Conference at the Omni Coliseum.
Panama	Panama City	June 16–17	Invited by President Demetrio B. Lakas and General Omar Torrijos to sign protocol confirming exchange of documents ratifying Panama Canal treaties. Also met informally with Venezuelan President Carlos Andrés Pérez, Colombian President Alfonso López Michelsen, Mexican President José López Portillo, Costa Rican Rodrigo Carazo Odio and Jamaican Prime Minister Michael Manley.
Texas	Fort Worth, Houston, Beaumont, Fort Hood	June 23–24	Addressed local civic leaders at the Tarrant County Convention Center. Attended a Democratic fundraiser at the Hyatt Regency Houston Downtown, where he stayed overnight. Rededicated the Jack Brooks Federal Building. Reviewed troops at the Blackwell Mountain proving grounds at Fort Hood.

== July ==
State or country	Areas visited	Dates	Details
West Germany	Bonn, Wiesbaden-Erbenheim, Frankfurt, West Berlin	July 14–15	State visit. Met with President Walter Scheel and Chancellor Helmut Schmidt. Addressed U.S. and German military personnel. Spoke at the Berlin Airlift Memorial. Attended the 4th G7 summit.

== August ==
State or country	Areas visited	Dates	Details
Virginia	Norfolk	August 5	Commissioned the USS Mississippi at Naval Station Norfolk.
North Carolina	Wilson	August 5	Campaigned for John Ingram for Senate at the Wilson County Public Library. Attended a North Carolina Democratic Party at the Heart of Wilson Motor Inn. Toured a local tobacco business, Grower's Cooperative Warehouse Inc.
New York	New York	August 8–9	Signed legislation providing federal aid to the city at New York City Hall. Attended a performance of Ain't Misbehavin' at the Longacre Theatre. Dined at the United States Steak House. Stayed overnight Gracie Mansion as a guest of Mayor Ed Koch.
Missouri	Columbia	August 14	Addressed the Midcontinent Farmers Association at the Hearnes Multipurpose Building.
Idaho	Boise, Custer County	August 21–24	Stayed at the Rodeway Inn in Boise. Went whitewater rafting down the Middle Fork Salmon River, in an area which Carter would later grant federal protection as the Frank Church–River of No Return Wilderness, accompanied by his family and Secretary of the Interior Cecil Andrus.
Wyoming	Teton County, Moose, Jackson	August 24–30	Stayed at The Brinkerhoff. Toured Grand Teton National Park and Yellowstone National Park. Attended service at the Chapel of the Transfiguration. Attended a rodeo at the Jackson Hole Rodeo Grounds.

== September ==
State or country	Areas visited	Dates	Details
New Jersey	Atlantic City	September 20	Attended the groundbreaking ceremony for the National Aviation Facilities Experimental Center Technical and Administration Headquarters Building. Addressed the United Steelworkers of America convention at the Atlantic City Convention Center. Met with Soviet defector Pyotr Grigorenko. Attended a reception for Democratic county chairmen at the Boardwalk Regency Hotel.
North Carolina	Asheville	September 22	Campaigned for John Ingram for Senate at the Biltmore Estate.
South Carolina	Columbia	September 22	Campaigned for Charles D. Ravenel at a private residence.
Pennsylvania	Aliquippa, Center Township	September 23	Held a townhall meeting at Aliquippa High School. Campaigned for Eugene Atkinson for Congress at Ciro's Top of the Mall Restaurant at Beaver Valley Mall.
Ohio	Columbus	September 23	Dedicated the Mount Vernon Plaza shopping center. Remarks at a State Democratic Party Reception at the Aladdin Temple Shrine Mosque.

== October ==
State or country	Areas visited	Dates	Details
Florida	Merritt Island, Lake Buena Vista	October 1	Toured Kennedy Space Center, where he presented the first Congressional Space Medal of Honor awards to six astronauts (one posthumously). Toured Walt Disney World on the seventh anniversary of its opening, viewing a model of the future EPCOT Center. Addressed the International Chamber of Commerce World Congress at King Stefan's Banquet Hall.
Pennsylvania	Franklin County	October 7	Went fishing on Long Pine Run Reservoir in Michaux State Forest.
West Virginia	Elkins	October 7	Attended the Mountain State Forest Festival, joining the parade at Elkins High School.
Maryland	Baltimore	October 18	Campaigned for Harry Hughes at the Baltimore Civic Center.
Kansas	Wichita	October 21	Campaigned for William R. Roy for Senate and John W. Carlin for governor at Century II Performing Arts & Convention Center, where he also signed the Farm Credit Extension Act.
Minnesota	Rochester, Minneapolis	October 21	Attended a Minnesota Democratic–Farmer–Labor Party campaign rally at Rochester Municipal Airport. Met with supporters of Michael O. Freeman for Congress at the Leamington Hotel. Signed the Lock and Dam 26 Waterway Users Act in a ceremony at the Minneapolis Auditorium, where he attended another Democratic–Farmer–Labor campaign rally.
Tennessee	Nashville	October 26	Attended a Tennessee Democratic Party rally at Legislative Plaza and a fundraiser at the Hyatt Regency hotel.
Florida	Miami Beach	October 26	Attended a Florida Democratic Party rally at North Shore Community Center Park, and a fundraiser for state senator Bob Graham for governor at the Fontainebleau Miami Beach.
New York	Buffalo	October 28	Attended a campaign rally at Greater Buffalo International Airport.
Connecticut	Hartford	October 28	Attended a fundraiser for Governor Ella Grasso at the Hilton hotel, and a Democratic fundraiser at the Sonesta Hotel.
Massachusetts	Lynn, Lynnfield	October 28	Attended a campaign rally at Lynn City Hall. Remarks at a Reception for Representative Paul Tsongas for Senate and Edward J. King for governor at the Colonial Inn in Lynnfield.
Maine	Portland	October 28	Attended the Maine Democratic Party's Jefferson–Jackson Day Dinner at the Stevens Avenue Armory.

== November ==
State or country	Areas visited	Dates	Details
New York	New York	November 2	Spoke at a Get Out the Vote rally at Federal Hall National Memorial, and a Democratic fundraiser at the home of Arthur B. Krim.
Michigan	Flint	November 2	Spoke at a Get Out the Vote rally at the Industrial Mutual Association Auditorium.
Illinois	Skokie, Chicago	November 2	Campaigned for Representative Abner Mikva at the home of Newton N. Minow. Spoke at a Get Out the Vote rally at Niles East High School. Stayed overnight at the home of Chicago mayor Michael A. Bilandic.
Oregon	Gresham	November 3	Spoke at a Get Out the Vote rally at Mount Hood Community College.
California	Sacramento	November 3	Spoke at a Get Out the Vote rally on the K Street Mall.
Minnesota	Duluth	November 3	Spoke at a Get Out the Vote rally at the Duluth Arena Auditorium.
Missouri	Kansas City	November 9	Held a press conference at the Muehlebach Hotel. Addressed the Future Farmers of America convention at Kansas City Municipal Auditorium.
Missouri	St. Louis	November 27	Addressed the National League of Cities Congress of Cities at the St. Louis Convention Center.
Utah	Salt Lake City	November 27	Received the Church of Jesus Christ of Latter-day Saints Family Unity Award at the Mormon Tabernacle.

== December ==
State or country	Areas visited	Dates	Details
New York	New York	December 5	Attended a fundraiser for the campaign debts of former mayor Abraham Beame at the Metropolitan Opera House, including a benefit performance of Aida.
Tennessee	Memphis	December 8–9	Attended the 1978 Democratic Midterm Conference at the Cook Convention Center. Stayed at the Rivermont Holiday Inn. Visited the Lorraine Motel, the site of the assassination of Martin Luther King Jr., and placed a wreath on the balcony.
Georgia	Atlanta	December 22	Visited his newborn granddaughter, Sarah Carter, at Crawford W. Long Memorial Hospital.
