= 2026 Republican National Convention =

U.S. political event held in Dallas, Texas

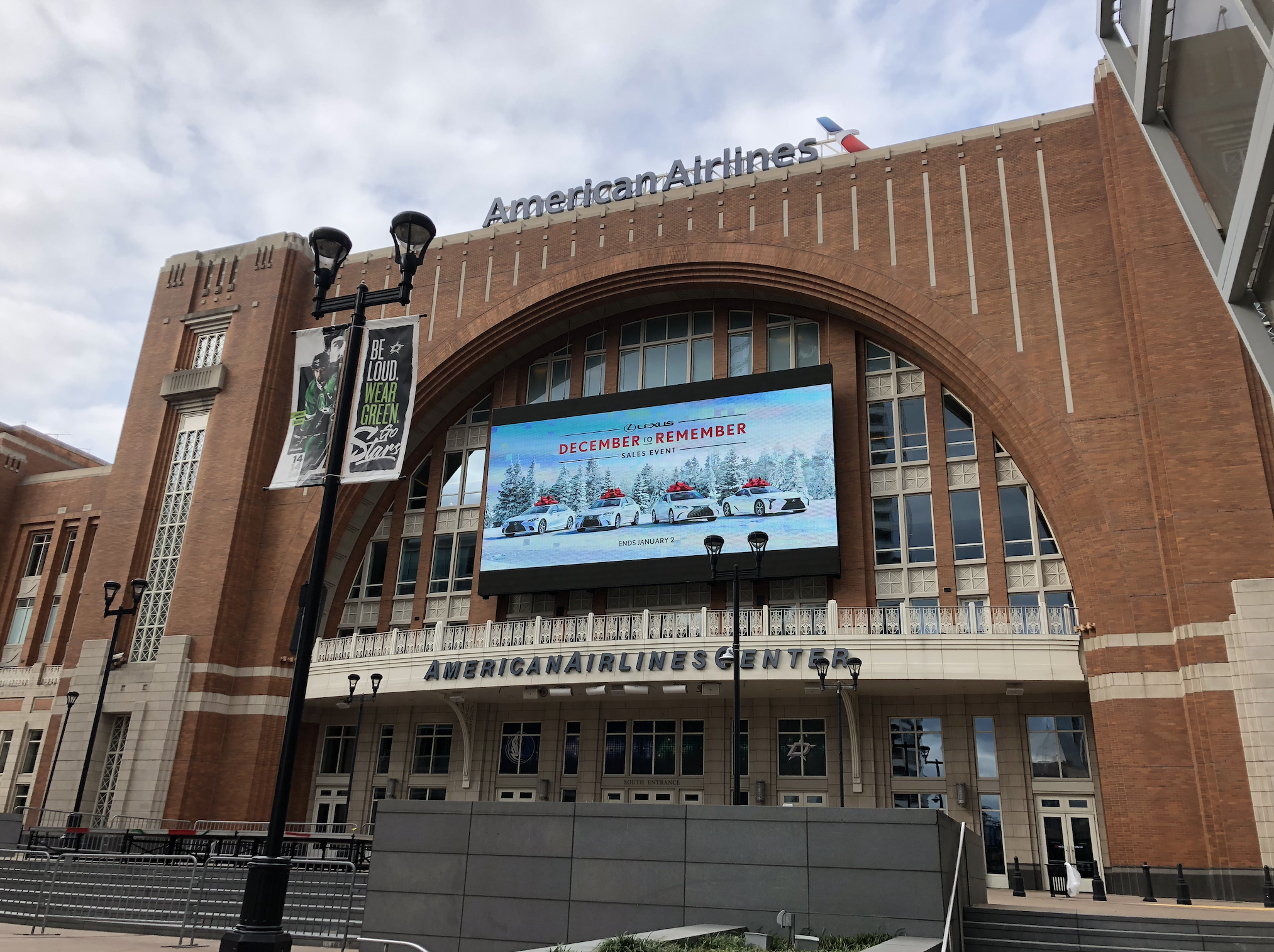
- American Airlines Center, venue of convention

Convention
- Dates: September 9–10, 2026
- City: Dallas, Texas
- Venue: American Airlines Center
- Keynote speaker: Donald Trump & JD Vance
- Notable speakers: Scott Bessent; Todd Blanche; Robert F. Kennedy Jr. Karoline Leavitt; Mehmet Oz; Donald Trump Jr. Scott Turner

The 2026 Republican National Convention, referred to colloquially in the media and public discourse as Trumpapalooza, was held from September 9 to 10, 2026, at the American Airlines Center in Dallas, Texas, ahead of the 2026 United States midterm elections.

Republicans would go on to lose the House and Senate in what was described as a "blue tsunami".

== Background ==
While national party conventions in presidential election years are a quadrennial tradition in United States politics, it is historically uncommon for a similar event to be held by either of the two major parties outside of presidential election years. Previously, only three large, major-party conferences were held outside of a presidential election year, all by the Democratic Party from 1974 through 1982: Kansas City in 1974, Memphis in 1978, and Philadelphia in 1982. In 2026, National Journal described the three Democratic midterm conventions as unsuccessful, particularly 1974 and 1978 conferences, which were held in December, after the respective elections in those years. In 1985, Paul G. Kirk, as chair of the Democratic National Committee, discontinued the practice, calling midterm conferences "places for mischief" which wasted party resources.

The 2026 convention marked the first midterm convention for the Republican Party.

== Planning and scheduling ==
As early as November 2025, President Donald Trump had been exploring the possibility of a midterm Republican convention. "That's not a thing." House Speaker Mike Johnson later recounted telling Trump, who replied, "Make it a thing." At the January 2026 winter meeting of the Republican National Committee (RNC), the party's procedures were amended to permit a midterm convention. In March 2026, The New York Times reported that Trump and the RNC had examined Dallas as a possible host city. Also in March 2026, the Democratic Party ruled out the possibility of holding their own midterm convention.

In June 2026, Texas attorney general and 2026 Republican nominee for United States Senate Ken Paxton announced that the 2026 Republican National Convention would be held in Dallas in September. Also in June, Trump announced that the convention would be held September 9 and 10. White House aide John Hiller served as the chief executive officer of the convention's organizing board.

The convention assembled 4 p.m. to 10 p.m. ET each day. The main speaking portion of the convention was planned to be held for two hours each evening.

The timing of the convention placed it counter to the broadcast of the first two National Football League (NFL) games of the 2026 NFL season, which were played on the same evenings. Maggie Haberman reported that Trump and his advisers were unaware that the NFL season was scheduled to start when they selected these dates.

=== Trump-a-palooza ===
A nickname for the event that received traction was "Trump-a-palooza". This nickname was used by Republican leaders, including in an official promotional statement by Joe Gruters (Republican National Committee chairman).

== Logistics ==
Unlike the party's presidential nominating conventions, the 2026 convention did not feature delegates, votes on party business, or formal nomination of candidates for office. Instead, it functioned as a high-profile campaign rally.

The convention made use of local volunteers for parts of its operations.

=== Security ===
The United States Secret Service, Dallas Police Department, Dallas Fire-Rescue Department, and Dallas Area Rapid Transit police were involved in security operations for the convention, coordinated via the city's emergency operations center.

In August, law enforcement officials announced that security measures, such as temporary fencing and barriers surrounding the arena, would be put in place beginning on September 4. Road closures around the arena on Victory, Houston, Nowitzki, Payne, and Field streets were planned for September 7 through 11. Victory station was to be closed September 8 through 10. There were also flight restrictions imposed around Downtown Dallas. Dallas police announced intention to secure designated areas for protests.

Dallas expected to spend nearly $2 million in city funds towards security and other logistics related to the convention, including $1.8 million for city police officers to provide security and $14,000 to be spent by the Department of Transportation and Public Works. Several Dallas officials voiced concern over cost to the city government, as the city already was facing a projected $30 million budget shortfall. There is no expectation that Dallas will receive a reimbursement grant for any costs incurred in securing the event.

=== Attendance ===
In advance of the event, RNC advertised the 2026 convention as poised to be the largest Republican National Convention since 2016. The convention was expected to bring approximately 20,000 visitors to Dallas. Though Trump falsely claimed that the arena was full with thousands waiting outside (seeking entrance), the media observed that the arena, in fact, had thousands of empty seats. It was observed that almost the entirety of the venue's upper level seating was unoccupied during the convention.

Many Republican lawmakers and Republican candidates for office declined in advance to attend the convention, especially those running in districts or states viewed as competitive in the 2026 elections. One week before the convention, Politico reported that 45 of 70 interviewed Republican candidates for the House of Representatives stated that they will not be attending the convention. First Lady Melania Trump did not attend.

=== Fundraising and ticket sales ===
The convention was used by Trump and the RNC to raise millions of dollars of political contributions, including by charging $250,000 per person for attendance at a round table with Trump and $65,000 for a photo opportunity with the president. The Hill reported that incumbent Republican legislators have been asked to pay $25,000 for the opportunity to attend. Ticket prices have varied among state parties. Alabama's tickets to the convention are being sold at a reported price range of between $1,300 to $1,500; while California is selling some of its tickets at the "golden VIP member" price of $250,000. The National Republican Congressional Committee (NRCC) reportedly distributed more than 2,000 tickets. Days before the event, tickets were made available to the public for free.

=== Balloon drop ===
A balloon drop, similar to those traditionally held at the end of major party presidential conventions, took place at the end of Trump's closing remarks. The balloon drop was orchestrated by Treb Heining, a decades veteran of convention balloon drops. This was the eleventh balloon drop that Heining had orchestrated for the Republican National Committee.

The balloon drop featured approximately 100,000 balloons which were dropped from nets in the rafters of the arena. The balloons had been set-up by dozens of volunteers in the weekend prior to the convention.

== Themes ==
The convention highlighted candidates and issues the Republican Party argues are shaping the midterm elections. The first evening included segments on tax cuts, healthcare affordability, the border, trade and domestic manufacturing, including appearances from "workers and everyday Americans." The second evening advanced the argument that American families have benefited from Trump's policies, highlighting his "no tax on tips" proposal and policies on overtime pay and Social Security. The convention will also feature segments on overseas prisoners who have been released under Trump, border security, prescription drug costs, a tribute to the assassinated activist Charlie Kirk, and a segment on the 25th anniversary of the September 11 attacks.

== Announcements ==
On the first night, Trump promised to give every American adult $5,000 if the GOP won both the Senate and House of Representatives in the midterm elections, calling it a "Trump dividend." Trump's senior advisors did not know this proposal was coming, and some of his advisors disapproved of the offer, with one calling it a naked effort to "bribe" people for votes. JD Vance later expanded that it would be financed by tariff revenue, and would not go to high income Americans. The promise drew criticism and doubt over the feasibility of the payment totalling over $1.2 trillion; noting that similar previous promises by Trump of a "tariff dividend" of $2,000 in November 2025, and a DOGE dividend of $5,000 planned to be given to every American did not materialize.

In the closing speech by Trump he urged people to vote by saying they should "pretend I'm on the ticket". He also asked the audience to repeat a "pledge" to him personally as "the greatest president in the history of the United States", and to vote "even if you're not registered" and to "cheat like hell". Trump ended the pledge by saying "if you don't vote you go to hell".

== Speakers ==
President Donald Trump delivered a headlining speech on the first night, and Vice President JD Vance delivered a headlining speech on the second evening, followed by Trump's closing remarks.

=== Night 1 speakers ===
The following spoke on night one of the convention:

Speaker	Position/Notability
Joe Gruters	Chair of the Republican National Committee (RNC) and Florida state senator
Heather Washburne	President of the convention host committee and wife of Ray Washburne
Jack Graham	Pastor of Prestonwood Baptist Church
Monica de la Cruz	U.S. representative from Texas's 15th congressional district
Carlos de la Cruz	Gym owner and nominee for Texas's 35th congressional district
Scott Turner	United States secretary of Housing and Urban Development
Anna Paulina Luna	U.S. representative from Florida's 13th congressional district
Derrick Van Orden	U.S. representative from Wisconsin's 3rd congressional district
Steve Scalise	House majority leader and U.S. representative from Louisiana's 1st congressional district
Tom Emmer	House majority whip and U.S. representative from Minnesota's 6th congressional district
Michael Whatley	Former Chair of the Republican National Committee (RNC) and nominee for U.S. Senate in North Carolina
Austin Knudsen	Chair of the Republican Attorneys General Association (RAGA) and Montana attorney general
Tim Scott	Chair of the National Republican Senatorial Committee (NRSC) and U.S. senator from South Carolina
Brooke Rollins	United States Secretary of Agriculture
John Barrasso	Senate majority whip and U.S. senator from Wyoming
Brandon Gill	U.S. representative from Texas's 26th congressional district
Lorenzo Sewell	Non-denominational Christian pastor
Paul Perez	President of the National Border Patrol Council (NBPC)
Ken Paxton	Attorney General of Texas and nominee for U.S. Senate in Texas
Rob Bresnahan	U.S. representative from Pennsylvania's 8th congressional district
Jon Husted	U.S. Senator from Ohio
T. W. Shannon	Former speaker of the Oklahoma House of Representatives and nominee for Oklahoma lieutenant governor
Dave McCormick	U.S. senator from Pennsylvania
Adam Carolla	Television personality, comedian, and host of The Adam Carolla Show
Mike LiPetri	Former New York assemblyman and nominee for New York's 3rd congressional district
Mike Collins	U.S. representative from Georgia's 10th congressional district and nominee for U.S. Senate in Georgia
Todd Blanche	United States Attorney General
Mehmet Oz	Administrator of the Centers for Medicare and Medicaid Services
Byron Donalds	U.S. representative from Florida's 19th congressional district and nominee for governor of Florida
Mike Bouchard Jr.	Army National Guard captain and nominee for Michigan's 10th congressional district
Jay Feely	Former professional football player and nominee for Arizona's 1st congressional district
Scott Bessent	United States Secretary of the Treasury
Bo Nickal	Professional mixed martial artist
Justin Gaethje	Professional mixed martial artist
Keynote Address
Donald Trump	President of the United States

Additionally, the speech by Dave McCormick was preceded by a video introduction delivered by his fellow Pennsylvania U.S. senator John Fetterman. Fetterman, a Democrat, delivered remarks promising he would himself reject socialism and that he would "work with President Trump to fight and defend the steel way of life". Fetterman, when asked by reporters, denied that his remarks were delivered in support of the Republican Party or that he would switch parties.

There was also a video of Allyson Phillips, John Phillips, and Lauren Riley, the family of Laken Riley, addressing the convention.

=== Night 2 speakers ===
The following spoke on night two of the convention:

Speaker	Position/Notability
Heather Washburne	President of the convention host committee and wife of Ray Washburne
Joe Gruters	Chair of the Republican National Committee (RNC) and Florida state senator
Robert Jeffress	Senior pastor at First Baptist Church Dallas
Laurie Buckhout	Former assistant secretary of Defense for Cyber Policy and nominee for North Carolina's 1st congressional district
Jason Smith	U.S. Representative from Missouri's 8th congressional district
Ryan Mackenzie	U.S. representative from Pennsylvania's 7th congressional district
Greg Cunningham	Retired police officer and nominee for New Mexico's 2nd congressional district
Fabián Buglione	Freed captive of Venezuela
George Glezmann	Freed captive of the Taliban
Ronen and Orna Neutra	Parents of Omer Neutra
Dan Patrick	Lieutenant Governor of Texas
Oliver Henry	British social media influencer
Marty O'Donnell	Composer and nominee for Nevada's 3rd congressional district
Derek Merrin	Former Ohio state representative and nominee for Ohio's 9th congressional district
Lisa McClain	Chair of the House Republican Conference and U.S. representative from Michigan's 9th congressional district
Richard Hudson	Chair of the National Republican Congressional Committee (NRCC) and U.S. representative from North Carolina's 9th congressional district
Eric Flores	Former federal prosecutor and nominee for Texas's 34th congressional district
Tano Tijerina	Webb County judge and nominee for U.S. House in Texas's 28th congressional district
Brian Jack	U.S. representative from Georgia's 3rd congressional district
Ted Cruz	U.S. senator from Texas
Mike Johnson	Speaker of the U.S. House and U.S. representative from Louisiana's 4th congressional district
Lucas Miles	Vice President of TPUSA Faith
Mike Rogers	Former U.S. representative from Michigan's 8th congressional district and nominee for U.S. Senate in Michigan
Greg Abbott	Governor of Texas
Mike Lawler	U.S. representative from New York's 17th congressional district
Thomas, Jessica, and Madelon Gorman	Family of Sheridan Gorman, an 18 year old girl who was murdered by an illegal immigrant in 2026.
Ross Ulbricht	Pardoned cybercriminal who created and operated Silk Road
Robert F. Kennedy Jr.	United States Secretary of Health and Human Services
Eric Johnson	Mayor of Dallas, Texas
Karoline Leavitt	Former White House press secretary
Donald Trump Jr.	Businessman and son of President Donald Trump
Keynote Address
JD Vance	Vice President of the United States
Closing Remarks
Donald Trump	President of the United States

Frank Siller, the CEO of the Tunnel to Towers Foundation, addressed the convention with a 9/11 memorial video.

== Hoax website ==
A website appearing to be an official convention site, gopdallas2026.com, was able to obtain a much greater position in the Google Search results than the official convention website, gopconvention.com. As a result, hundreds of websites, including those of the The Dallas Morning News and The Daily Wire, mistakenly linked to the hoax website instead of the official site. Numerous news outlets cited information published on the hoax website as official, and reporters attempted to request convention credentials through the hoax website. On September 3, the website was changed to redirect visitors to the Epstein files, and a creative firm with ties to the Democratic Party accepted credit for the hoax site. Initially, the redirect was widely mistaken to have been a hack of an official convention website by those who still were under the impression that gopdallas2026.com was the official website.

== Broadcasts ==
Major television networks and many cable news channels did not plan significant dedicated coverage of the convention. C-SPAN was the only significant media outlet providing a complete and uninterrupted broadcast of the convention, including via its website. Fox News Channel and other Fox News Media platforms broadcast live from the convention venue on the days of the convention, and was the only major network to air Trump's speech in its entirety. CNN aired only fifteen minutes of Trump's address and MSNOW showed an intermittent split screen.

According to Nielsen ratings, Trump's night one address drew an average of 2.5 million people on Fox News, which is less than the average viewership of Hannity and Gutfeld!, the programs that would normally air at the same timeslot.

== Impact ==
The aggregate poll RealClearPolitics' Generic Congressional Vote recorded a more than two point boost in support of Democratic candidates in the days following the convention.

On September 30, the New York Times reported they have obtained an audio recording of Texas Attorney General and Senate candidate Ken Paxton speaking to Republican donors and claiming the convention had damaged them politically. According to the recording, Paxton was asked "Do you feel like he's a little bit of a drag?" and he responded "So to be honest with you, the numbers — when we did that convention — it dropped our numbers. Everybody's numbers dropped. Right now, yeah, not good."

== See also ==
- 1984 Republican National Convention —Republican presidential convention held in the same city
