= Democratic National Convention =

Nominating meetings of the US Democratic Party

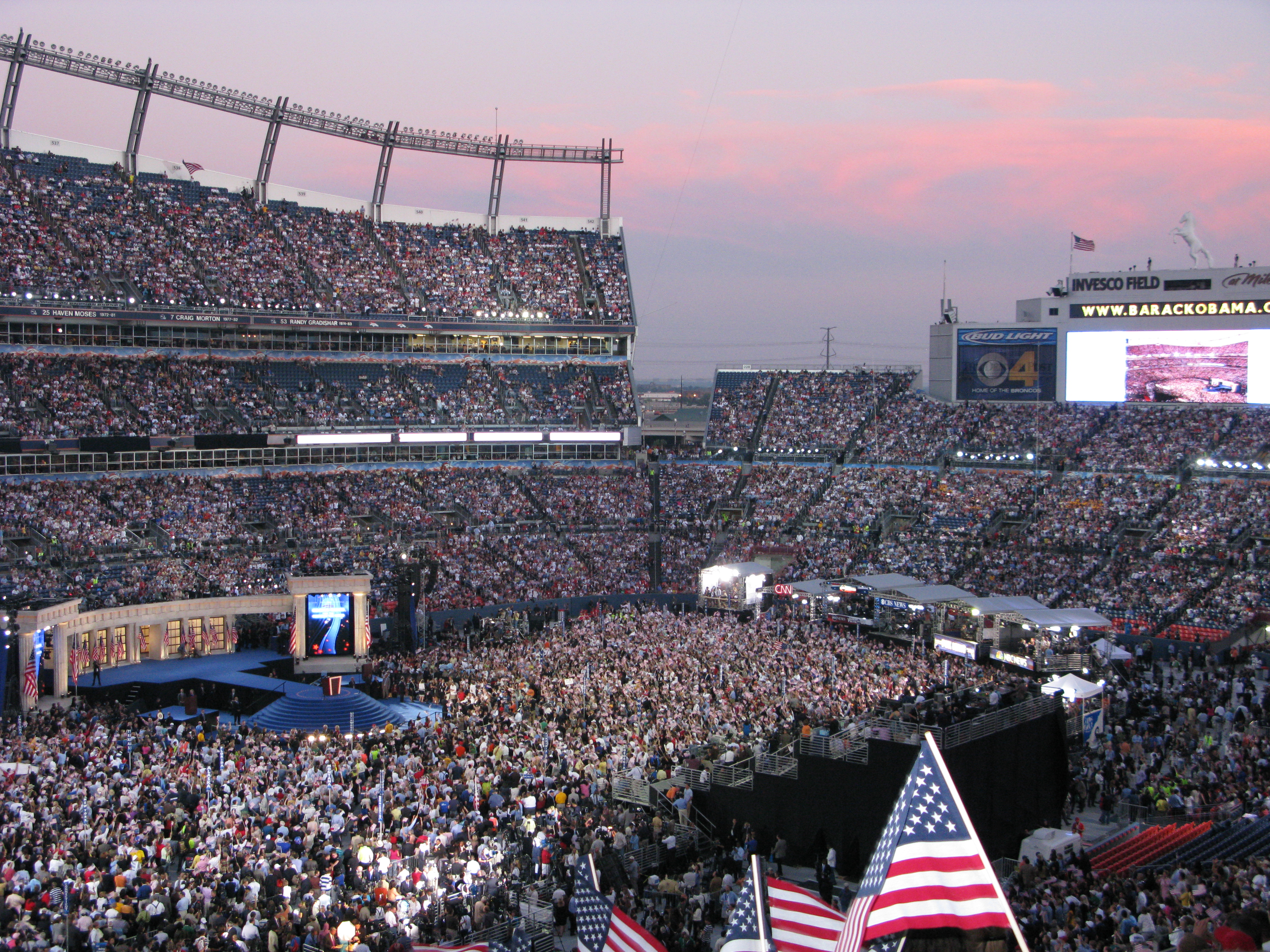
The final night of the 2008 Democratic National Convention in Denver prior to Barack Obama giving his acceptance speech for the presidential nomination

The Democratic National Convention (DNC) is a series of presidential nominating conventions held every four years since 1832 by the Democratic Party of the United States. (Note: Exceptions are the 1835 national convention, which occurred 3 years after the 1832 national convention, and the 1840 national convention, which occurred 5 years after the 1835 national convention.) They have been administered by the Democratic National Committee since the 1852 national convention. The primary goal of the Democratic National Convention is to officially nominate a candidate for president and vice president, adopt a comprehensive party platform, and unify the party. Pledged delegates from all fifty U.S. states, the District of Columbia, and the American territories, and superdelegates which are unpledged delegates representing the Democratic establishment, attend the convention and cast their votes to choose the party's presidential candidate. Like the Republican National Convention, the Democratic National Convention marks the formal end of the primary election period and the start of the general election season. Since the 1980s, national conventions have become mostly inaugural events for the winning candidate, since winners are announced long before the convention. In 2020, both major parties, and many minor parties, replaced their usual in-person conventions with virtual programs due to the COVID-19 pandemic.

== Delegations ==
The party's presidential nominee is chosen primarily by pledged delegates, which are in turn selected through a series of individual state caucuses and primary elections. Pledged delegates are classified into three categories:

- At-large pledged delegates are allocated and elected at the statewide level.
- District pledged delegates are allocated and elected at a district level, usually the congressional district, but sometimes by state or territory legislative district.
- Add-on or PLEO pledged delegates, which allow for representation by party leaders and elected officials within the state.

Unpledged superdelegates, delegates whose votes are not bound to the outcome of a state's caucus or primary, only vote in the event of a contested nomination. These superdelegates may also be called unpledged PLEO (party leaders and elected officials) delegates.

The size of delegations to the Democratic National Convention, for each state, territory, or other political subdivision, are described in the party's quadrennial Call for the Democratic National Convention.

=== Pledged delegate allocation ===
==== Allocation formula for the 50 U.S. states and Washington, D.C. ====
Since 2012, the number of pledged delegates allocated to each of the 50 U.S. states and Washington, D.C. is based on two main factors: (1) the proportion of votes each state gave to the Democratic candidate in the last three presidential elections, and (2) the number of electoral votes each state has in the Electoral College.

The calculations for the 2020 convention basically consist of the following three steps:

Step 1: The following formula is first used to determine each jurisdiction's allocation factor:

$\text{Allocation factor} = {1 \over 2} \times \left ( {\text{SDV}_{\text{2008}} + \text{SDV}_{\text{2012}} + \text{SDV}_{\text{2016}} \over \text{TDV}_{\text{2008}} + \text{TDV}_{\text{2012}} + \text{TDV}_{\text{2016}}} + {\text{SEV} \over 538} \right )$

where

SDV = The state's Democratic vote in the indicated presidential election
TDV = The nationwide total Democratic vote in the indicated presidential election
SEV = The state's electoral votes

Step 2: The base delegation for each state and the District of Columbia is then determined by multiplying its allocation factor by 3,200 (rounded to the nearest integer):

$\text{Base delegation} = \text{Allocation factor} \times 3200$

Step 3: Finally, the jurisdiction's base delegation is used to calculate the number of its District, At-Large, and pledged PLEO (party leaders and elected officials who are not superdelegates) delegates (fractions 0.5 and above are rounded to the next highest integer):

$\text{At-large delegates} = \text{Base delegation} \times 0.25$

$\text{District delegates} = \text{Base delegation} - \text{At-large delegates}$

$\text{Pledged PLEO delegates} = \text{Base delegation} \times 0.15$

==== Allocations to other jurisdictions ====
Jurisdictions without electoral votes are instead given a fixed amount of pledged delegates. In 2020, American Samoa, Guam, Northern Mariana Islands, and the U.S. Virgin Islands each get six at-large delegates. Democrats Abroad gets 12 at-large and one pledged PLEO.

Puerto Rico is assigned 44 base votes in 2020, then the same formulas used in Step 3 above for U.S. states are used to calculate the territory's at-large, district, and PLEO pledged delegates:

$\text{At-large delegates}_{\text{PR2020}} = 44 \times 0.25 = 11$

$\text{District delegates}_{\text{PR2020}} = 44 - \text{At-large delegates}_{\text{PR2020}} = 44 - 11 = 33$

$\text{Pledged PLEO delegates}_{\text{PR2020}} = 44 \times 0.15 = 6.6 \to 7$

==== Bonus delegates ====
The Democratic Party awards bonus pledged delegates to each jurisdiction based on two factors: timing and clustering. The timing criterion is based on when the state holds its primaries or caucuses with those states scheduling their contests in May and June getting the higher bonus. For clustering, three or more neighboring states must concurrently begin on the same date.

The bonus awarded is then a percentage increase in the jurisdiction's delegation (rounded to the nearest integer). A fourth of the bonus delegates are then designated as District, and the other three-fourths become At-Large.

The bonuses are:

- Timing Stage 1 (before April): No bonus
- Timing Stage 2 (April): 10 percent increase
- Cluster: 15 percent increase
- Both Timing Stage 2 and Cluster: 25 percent increase
- Timing Stage 3 (May and June): 30 percent increase
- Both Timing Stage 3 and Cluster: 35 percent increase

==== Awarding delegates to the candidates ====
Based on the results of each of the primaries and caucuses, pledged delegates are awarded to the candidates under proportional representation, where candidates who get 15 percent or more of the popular vote in a state or one of its districts divide the respective delegates proportionally to the votes on the respective level (those who get under 15 percent of the votes in a state and all of its districts do not get any delegates). Statewide and district delegates are strictly separate, they are both proportionally allocated based on the popular vote in the state or the respective districts. The statewide delegates are furthermore separated into two groups, at-large delegates and pledged PLEO delegates, which are both allocated proportionally based on the statewide vote but calculated separately. This amounts to in fact three different delegate groups, allocated proportionally but separately, leading to contortion and slightly unproportional results.

=== Superdelegates ===
A superdelegate is an unpledged delegate to the Democratic National Convention who is seated automatically and chooses for themselves for whom they vote. These superdelegates include elected officials, and party activists and officials. They make up slightly under 15 percent of all convention delegates.

Superdelegates fall into four categories:

- Elected members of the Democratic National Committee
- Democratic Governors, including territorial governors and the Mayor of the District of Columbia
- Democratic Members of Congress, District of Columbia shadow senators and non-voting House members.
- Distinguished party leaders (consisting of current and former Presidents, Vice Presidents, congressional leaders, and DNC chairs)

Democratic superdelegates are free to support any candidate for the presidential nomination. On August 25, 2018, the Democratic National Committee agreed to reduce the influence of superdelegates by generally preventing them from voting on the first ballot at the Democratic National Convention, allowing their votes only in a contested nomination.

In the 2024 presidential election cycle, the Democratic National Committee held a virtual nomination vote in the first week of August to select its nominee. The virtual nomination rules allowed superdelegates to vote for a presidential candidate during the first ballot of the virtual roll call.

== Presidential candidate nomination ==
From 1832 to 1936, any nomination for president or vice-president was required to have a majority of two-thirds of the total number of delegates. Unless there was a popular incumbent, something that only happened three times between the Civil War and World War II, getting that many votes on the first ballot were virtually impossible.

This resulted in often contentious debate that riled the passions of party leaders, with delegates being forced to vote for a nominee until someone could receive the minimum number of delegates required. This situation occurred at the conventions of 1852, 1856, 1868, 1912, 1920 and most notoriously, 1924, where the voting went for at least a dozen ballots.

In 1860, the convention deadlocked after 57 ballots, during which 50 Southern delegates walked out; subsequently, second and third conventions nominated separate Northern and Southern tickets.

Backroom deals by party bosses were normal and often resulted in compromise nominees that became known as dark horse candidates, people who never imagined they would run for president until the last moments of the convention. Dark horse candidates were chosen in order to break deadlocks between more popular and powerful prospective nominees that blocked each other from gaining enough delegates to be nominated.

One of the most famous dark horse candidates nominated at a Democratic National Convention was James K. Polk, who was chosen to become the candidate for president only after being added to the eighth and ninth delegate ballot.

The rules were changed to a simple majority in 1936. Since then, only one multi-ballot convention (in the 1952) has taken place.

In 2016, Hillary Clinton became the first female presidential nominee of a major party in the United States.

== Vice-presidential candidate nomination ==
Before 1980, the party's choice of the vice-presidential nominee was usually not known until the last evening of the convention. This was because the presidential nominee had little to do with the process, and in many cases was not known at the start of the convention.

In 1944 and 1956, the nominee let the convention choose the running mate without any recommendation, which led to two ballots of voting being required in each case.

However, since 1984 (Mondale was the incumbent VP in 1980), vice-presidential nominees have always been announced by the presumptive nominee prior to the convention. During the 1984 Democratic National Convention, Geraldine Ferraro became the first female vice presidential nominee of a major party in the United States.

== Midterm conferences ==
In December 1974, the Democratic National Committee held a Conference on Democratic Policy and Organization, whose official focus was to "consider and adopt a permanent Charter for the Democratic Party ... and such other matters as may be authorized by the Democratic National Committee." The 1974 Conference was authorized by resolution of the 1972 Democratic National Convention, and was held in Kansas City, Missouri. Midterm conferences were subsequently held in 1978 in Memphis and 1982 in Philadelphia, at which future candidates for subsequent Democratic presidential primaries spoke.

Following the 1982 conference, the Democratic National Committee suspended further midterm conferences due to cost constraints. Revival of the Democratic midterm conference event has been repeatedly discussed, including as recently as 2025 in time for the 2026 United States elections., although the Democrats ultimately decided not to hold a midterm event in 2026.

== History ==
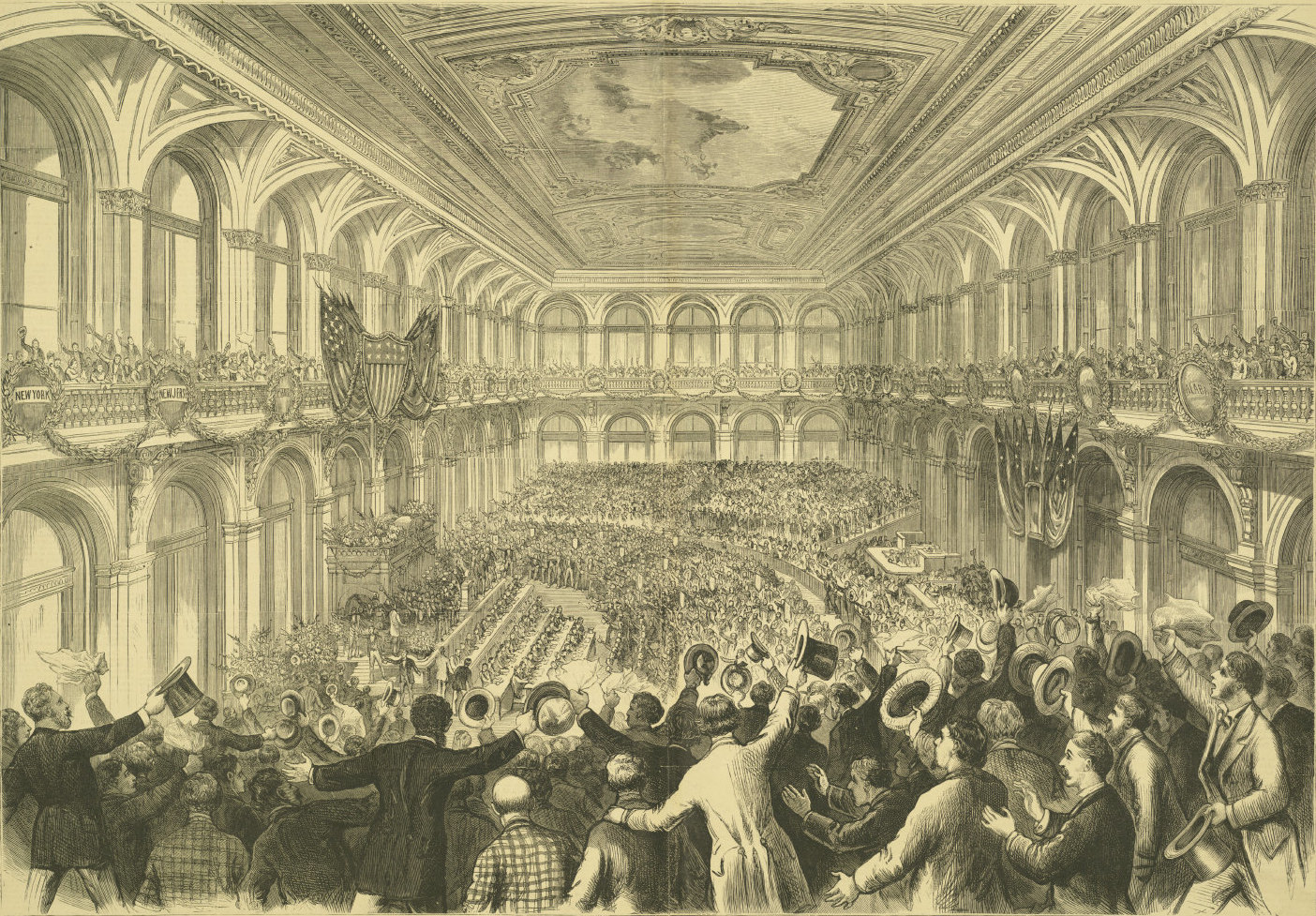
Illustration of the 1876 Democratic National Convention in St. Louis, Missouri

By 1824, the congressional nominating caucus had fallen into disrepute and collapsed as a method of nominating presidential and vice-presidential candidates. A national convention idea had been brought up, but nothing occurred until the next decade: state conventions and state legislatures emerged as the nomination apparatus until they were supplanted by the national convention method of nominating candidates. President Andrew Jackson's "Kitchen Cabinet" privately carried out the plan for the first Democratic National Convention: the public call for the first national convention emanated from Jackson's supporters in New Hampshire in 1831.

The first national convention of the Democratic Party began in Baltimore on May 21, 1832, only to nominate a vice-presidential candidate as it was clear that Jackson as the party's natural leader would run for the presidency again. In that year the rule requiring a two-thirds vote to nominate a candidate was created, and Martin Van Buren was nominated for vice president on the first ballot. Although this rule was waived in the 1836 and 1840 conventions – when Van Buren was nominated as presidential candidate by acclamation – in 1844, it was revived by opponents of former President Van Buren, who had the support of a majority (but not two-thirds) of the delegates, in order to prevent him from receiving the nomination after his 1840 defeat. The rule then remained in place until 1936, when the renomination of President Franklin D. Roosevelt by acclamation allowed it finally to be put to rest.

On seven occasions, this rule led to Conventions which dragged on for over a dozen ballots. The most infamous examples of this were in 1860 at Charleston, when the convention deadlocked after 57 ballots: the delegates adjourned, and reconvened in separate Northern and Southern groups six weeks later, and in 1924, where "Wets" and "Drys" deadlocked between the frontrunners, Alfred E. Smith and William G. McAdoo, for 102 ballots over 16 days before finally agreeing on John W. Davis as a compromise candidate on the 103rd ballot. Also, in 1912, Champ Clark received a majority of the votes, but did not subsequently go on to achieve a two-thirds vote and the nomination (Woodrow Wilson won the nomination on the 46th ballot), the only time this happened.

Since 1932, only one convention (in 1952) has required multiple ballots. While the rule was in force, it virtually assured that no candidate without support from the South could be nominated. The elimination of the two-thirds rule made it possible for liberal Northern Democrats to gain greater influence in party affairs, leading to the disenfranchisement of Southern Democrats, and defection of many of the latter to the Republican Party, especially during the Civil Rights struggles of the 1960s.

William Jennings Bryan delivered his "Cross of Gold" speech at the 1896 convention, while the most historically notable and tumultuous convention in recent memory was the 1968 Democratic National Convention in Chicago, Illinois, which was fraught with highly emotional battles between conventioneers and Vietnam War protesters and an outburst by Chicago mayor Richard J. Daley. Other confrontations between various groups, such as the Yippies and members of the Students for a Democratic Society, and the Chicago police in city parks, streets and hotels marred this convention.

Following the 1968 convention, in which many reformers had been disappointed that Vice President Hubert Humphrey, despite not having competed in a single primary, easily won the nomination over Senators Eugene McCarthy and George McGovern (who was announced after the assassination of another candidate, Senator Robert F. Kennedy), a commission headed by Senator McGovern reformed the Democratic Party's nominating process to increase the power of primaries in choosing delegates in order to increase the democracy of the process. Not entirely coincidentally, McGovern himself won the nomination in 1972. The 1972 convention was significant in that the new rules put into place as a result of the McGovern commission also opened the door for quotas mandating that certain percentages of delegates be women or members of minority groups, and subjects that were previously deemed not fit for political debate, such as abortion and lesbian and gay rights, now occupied the forefront of political discussion.

The nature of Democratic (and Republican) conventions has changed considerably since the 1972 McGovern reforms (which have largely influenced the Republican primaries as well). Every four years, the nominees are essentially selected earlier and earlier in the year, so the conventions now officially ratify the nominees instead of choose them. The 1976 convention was the last where the vice-presidential nominee was announced during the convention, after the presidential nominee was chosen (Carter chose Walter Mondale). The 1980 convention was the last convention for the Democrats that was seriously contested (when Ted Kennedy forced a failed vote to free delegates from their commitment to vote for Jimmy Carter). Even the close race of 2008, which was not decided until early June, did not signify a change of the modern function of the convention, as superdelegates and Hillary Clinton's withdrawal ensured Barack Obama's win before the convention.

Prior to the 2020 convention in Milwaukee (which due to COVID-19 was moved from the larger Fiserv Forum to the smaller Wisconsin Center, with the acceptance speeches delivered from the Chase Center on the Riverfront in Wilmington, Delaware), the 1984 convention at the Moscone Center in San Francisco was the last Democratic Convention to be held in a convention center complex; all the intervening and subsequent years saw their conventions held in sports arenas.

== See also ==
Democratic Party

- Democratic Party (United States) organizations
- Factions in the Democratic Party (United States)
- History of the Democratic Party (United States)
- Political positions of the Democratic Party (United States)
- List of Democratic National Conventions
- List of state parties of the Democratic Party (United States)
- List of United States Democratic Party presidential candidates
- List of United States Democratic Party presidential tickets
