= 1982 Democratic Midterm Conference =

1982 conference in Philadelphia

- 1982 United States elections

Convention
- Dates: June 25–27, 1982
- City: Philadelphia, Pennsylvania
- Venue: Philadelphia Civic Center
- Total delegates: 897

The 1982 Democratic Midterm Conference was a "mini-convention" held by the Democratic Party ahead of the 1982 midterm elections. It took place June 25–27, 1982, at the Philadelphia Civic Center. This was the last major party convention held in a midterm election year until the Republican Party held one in 2026.

== Background and logistics ==
Democrats had previously held midterm-year conferences (somewhat similar to the Democratic National Conventions held in presidential years) in December (after the election) during the two preceding midterm years (meeting in Kansas City in 1974, and Memphis in 1978). Midterm conferences had often been dubbed "mini conventions". The 1982 conference was held before that year's midterm elections. The previous two midterm conferences had been marred by party infighting. Party leaders had hoped to avoid similar infighting in 1982.

The conference was held at the Philadelphia Civic Center June 25–June 27, 1982. The conferences was downscaled from the previous two midterm conventions, featuring 897 delegates. Approximately 120 delegates were members of organized labor organizations, giving labor a significant bloc of the delegates. The factions of the party that had led infighting at the previous midterm two conferences were denied sizable representation at the 1982 conference.

== Speakers ==
Among the speakers were House Speaker Tip O'Neill as well as multiple expected candidates for the 1984 Democratic Party presidential primaries. No candidate had yet announced their campaign for president, but six expected candidates spoke. Chief among them was former vice president Walter Mondale). Speakers lambasted the Reagan administration, faulting President Ronald Reagan for rising unemployment, rising interest rates, cuts to Social Security, policies favoring the wealthy, and the failure to ratify the Equal Rights Amendment. Mondale argued that Reagan had created "two Americas —one where the well-to-do get more and more, and one where the rest of us get less and less." Another major speaker was Senator Ted Kennedy, at the time thought of as a likely contender for the presidential nomination (having previously run in 1980). Kennedy spoke on the second morning of the conference, reportedly because prospective presidential contenders who spoke to the conference on its first evening did not want their speeches scheduled in close time proximity to one by Kennedy; since Kennedy was remembered to have delivered rousing speeches that had upstaged the speeches by Jimmy Carter at the 1978 Democratic Midterm Conference and the 1980 Democratic National Convention (the latter being where Kennedy delivered his The Dream Shall Never Die speech).

Other expected 1984 presidential contenders that spoke included Senators Gary Hart, Alan Cranston, John Glenn, and Fritz Hollings. Florida Governor Reubin Askew (another expected candidate) declined a speaking slot, declaring that he wanted to remain "low key" until making a decision on whether he would run. Askew still attended and socialized directly with attending party members.

== Policy document ==
The convention included the adoption of a policy, document, which was effectively a midterm equivalent of the policy platforms adopted at national conventions in presidential election years. The conference saw several disputes on resolutions and policy planks.

Proposals were put forward to amend the original draft with a call for national health insurance, a call increased federal aid for education, and direct criticism of the effects that Reagan’s economic policies specifically had on women. While organized labor was initially anticipated to push for changes to the policy document, ahead of the convention AFL-CIO leadership indicated that they had decided not to challenge the policy document. Without AFL-CIO backing, a labor effort to rewrite the policy document was not likely to prevail.

One of the more controversial proposals was a proposed declaration in the foreign policy section of the policy document regarding the 1982 Lebanon War between Lebanon and Israel. Mark A. Siegel of Maryland (who had years earlier resigned from the Carter administration, viewing Carter as inadequately sympathetic towards Israel) had proposed a resolution that would "A new opportunity exists to build a lasting peace for the people of Lebanon and greater security for Israel." Other delegates countered this by proposing that the platform should instead declare that the conflict presented "an opportunity for the reunification and restoration of Lebanese sovereignty and independence." Ultimately, the ratified policy document declared that the party "believes that the United States should exert every effort to reinstate Lebanese sovereignty and Israeli security".

Homosexual rights activists succeeded in amendment the platform to include language in the anti-discrimination plank against discrimination on the basis of sexual orientation.

== Other matters ==
All seven prospective presidential contenders sponsored hospitality suites at the conference. Prospective presidential contenders also attempted to win over support of attending Democrats by hosting receptions. Among the moments of drama during the conference was Ted Kennedy crashing a reception that Mondale was hosting at a downtown hotel.

For the conference, "Democrats for the 80's" (a political action committee headed by Pamela C. Harriman) printed a 350-page book titled '"Democratic Fact Book; Issues for the 80s", which was intended to instruct the efforts of congressional candidates in the 1982 midterm elections.

In advance of the opening of the convention, several meetings were held by the Democratic Party in relation to the convention, including a full meeting of the Democratic National Committee. Richard Richards (the chairman of the Republican National Committee) held a press conference in Philadelphia on the eve of the convention for the purpose of criticizing the Democrats. Charles Manatt (chairman of the Democratic National Committee) called this "tacky" of Richards. United Press International noted that it was not normal for a political leader to "interfere with official events of rival parties". Robert Neuman (communications director of the Democratic National Committee) condemned it as "a grand-standing bush league play".

== Aftermath ==
In the 1982 midterms, Democrats increased their House majority and netted several governorships. However, Republicans defended control of the Senate, with Democrats only netting a single more seat than they previously held.

In 1985, Paul G. Kirk, then-chairman of the Democratic National Committee, discontinued the party's midterm conventions, calling them "places for mischief" and believing they wasted party resources. This, consequently, was the last major party convention held in a midterm election year until the Republican Party held one in 2026.
