= Memphis International Auto Show =

The Memphis International Auto Show is an annual auto show held every January in Memphis, Tennessee. The event takes place at the Memphis Cook Convention Center in Downtown Memphis and is affiliated with the Motor Trend regional auto show circuit. Despite the event's title name, not all vehicles or automakers are featured due to the limited convention space. Although the event is opened to visitors in the greater Memphis area, including residents from Arkansas and Mississippi, it is mandated at all auto shows in Tennessee that under state law, no sales may take place on the premises, and signs to that effect must be posted. There was no 2021 show, which was deferred to 2022.

== Participating automakers ==
- BMW North America
  - BMW
  - Mini
- Fiat Chrysler Automobiles
  - Chrysler
  - Dodge
  - Jeep
  - Ram
  - Fiat
  - Ferrari
  - Maserati
- Ford
- General Motors
  - Buick
  - Chevrolet
  - GMC
- Lotus Cars
- Hyundai Kia Automotive Group
  - Hyundai
  - Kia
- Honda
  - Acura
- Mazda
- Mercedes-Benz Group
  - Mercedes-Benz
  - Smart
- Mitsubishi
- Nissan
  - Infiniti
  - Scion
- Subaru
- Tata Motors
  - Jaguar
  - Land Rover
- Toyota
  - Lexus
- Volkswagen Group
  - Audi
  - Bentley
  - Lamborghini
  - Porsche
  - Volkswagen
- Volvo
