= Renasant Convention Center =

Convention complex in Memphis, Tennessee

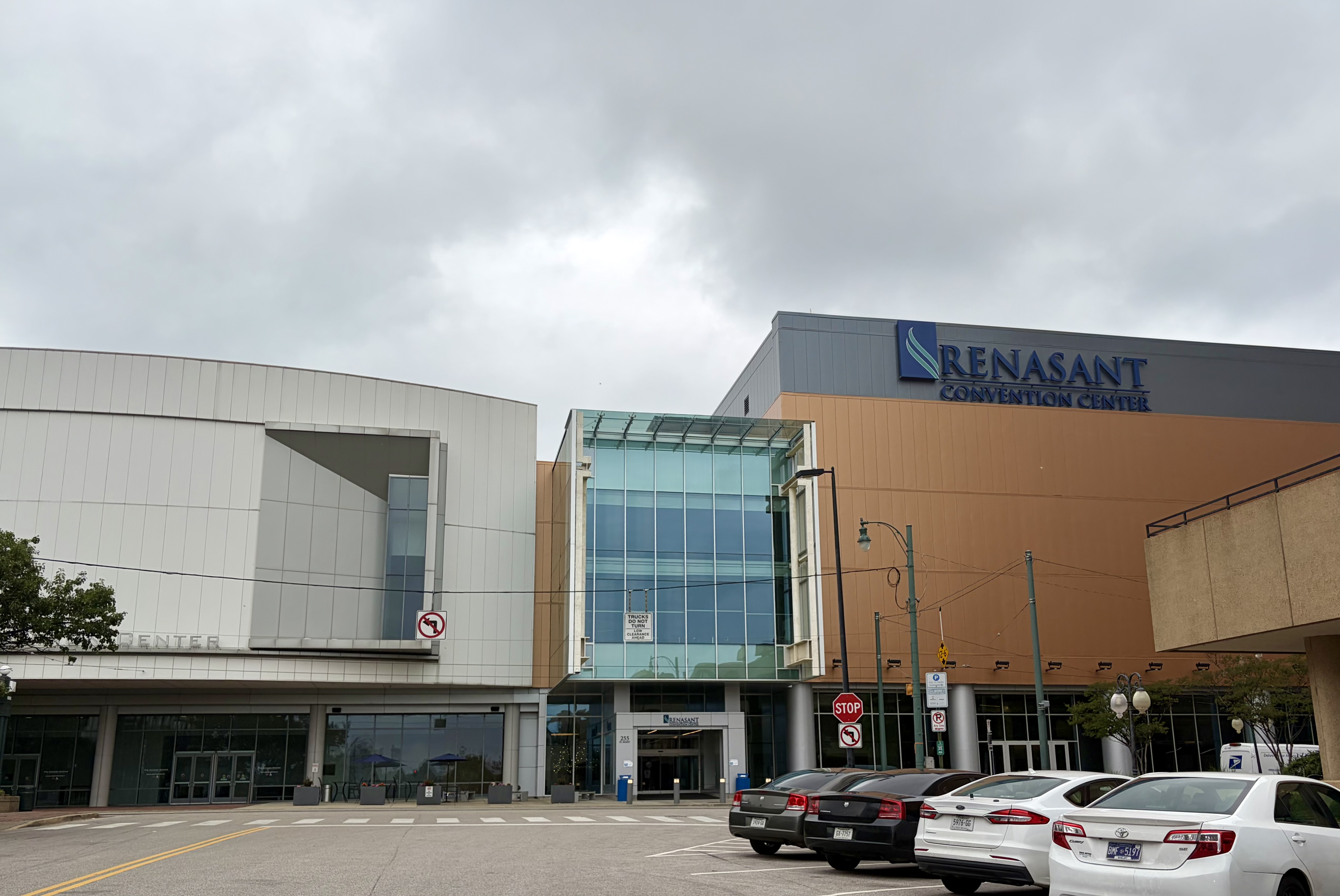
- The Main Street entrance to the Renasant Center
- Interactive map of Renasant Convention Center
- Address: 255 N Main St
- Location: Memphis, Tennessee 38103
- Coordinates: 35.151403°N 90.050772°W
- Public transit: MATA Trolley

Construction
- Built: 1968; 58 years ago
- Opened: 1968; 58 years ago
- Renovated: 2019
- Expanded: 1998-January 2003; 23 years ago
- Construction cost: Expansion/Renovation: 2003: $92 million ($147 million in 2025)

Website
- www.renasantconventioncenter.com

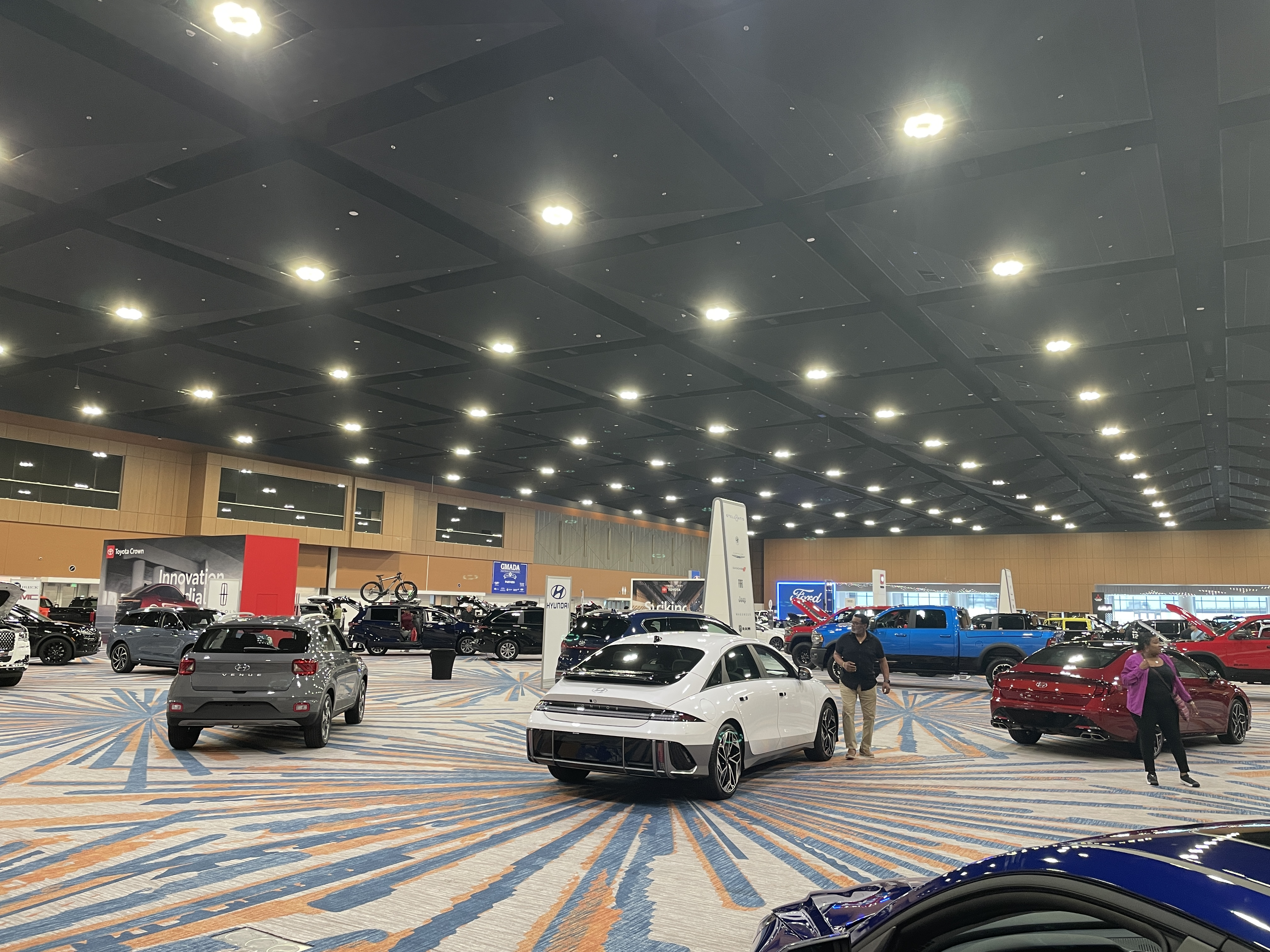
Memphis International Car Show in the Main Hall, April 2023

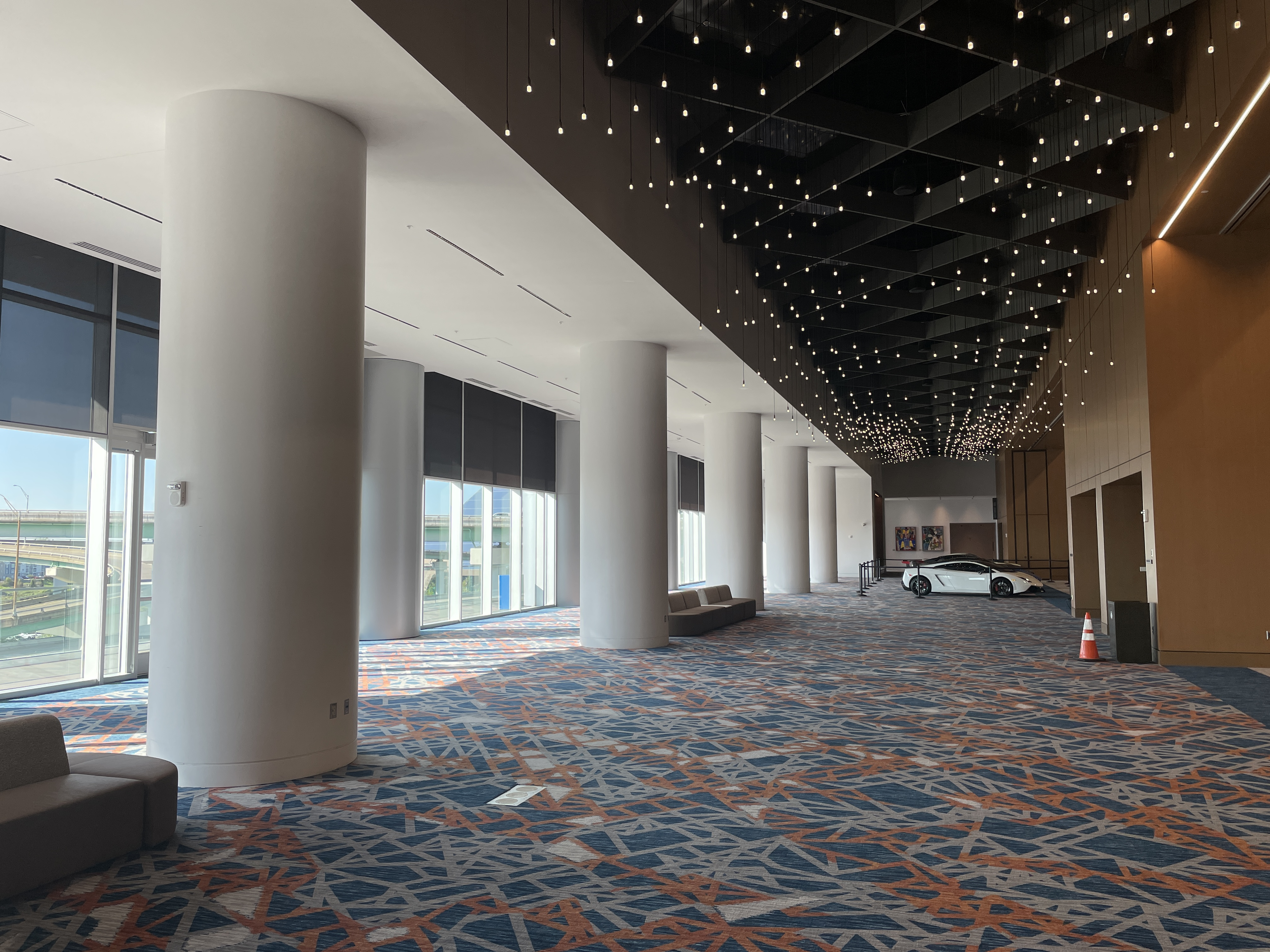
River View Lobby, April 2023

The Renasant Convention Center is a convention complex located in downtown Memphis, Tennessee, United States. The building is East of the Mississippi River just south of Interstate 40. The building's raised exhibition space spans over North Front Street. It was formerly known as the Memphis Cook Convention Center.

Notable annual events include the AutoZone national sales meeting, the Memphis International Auto Show, and the Mid-South Farm & Gin Show.

== Layout ==
The Renasant Convention Center consists of one large exhibit hall, two ballrooms, 30 meeting rooms, and The Cannon Center.

== History ==
The complex was designed by Haglund and Venable Architects, Ellers & Reaves (Structural), and Allen & Hoshall (Mechanical) in 1967. The complex expanded to include The Cannon Center in 2003 under the design architect LMN Architects in association with a joint venture of Williamson Pounders Architects and Pickering.

In 2018, the City of Memphis announced upgrades and renovations for the building, which were completed in 2021. Renasant Bank was announced as the naming rights partner in 2019.

== See also ==
- Memphis Riverline Hotel
