= 1978 Democratic Midterm Conference =

1978 conference in Tennessee

- 1978 United States elections
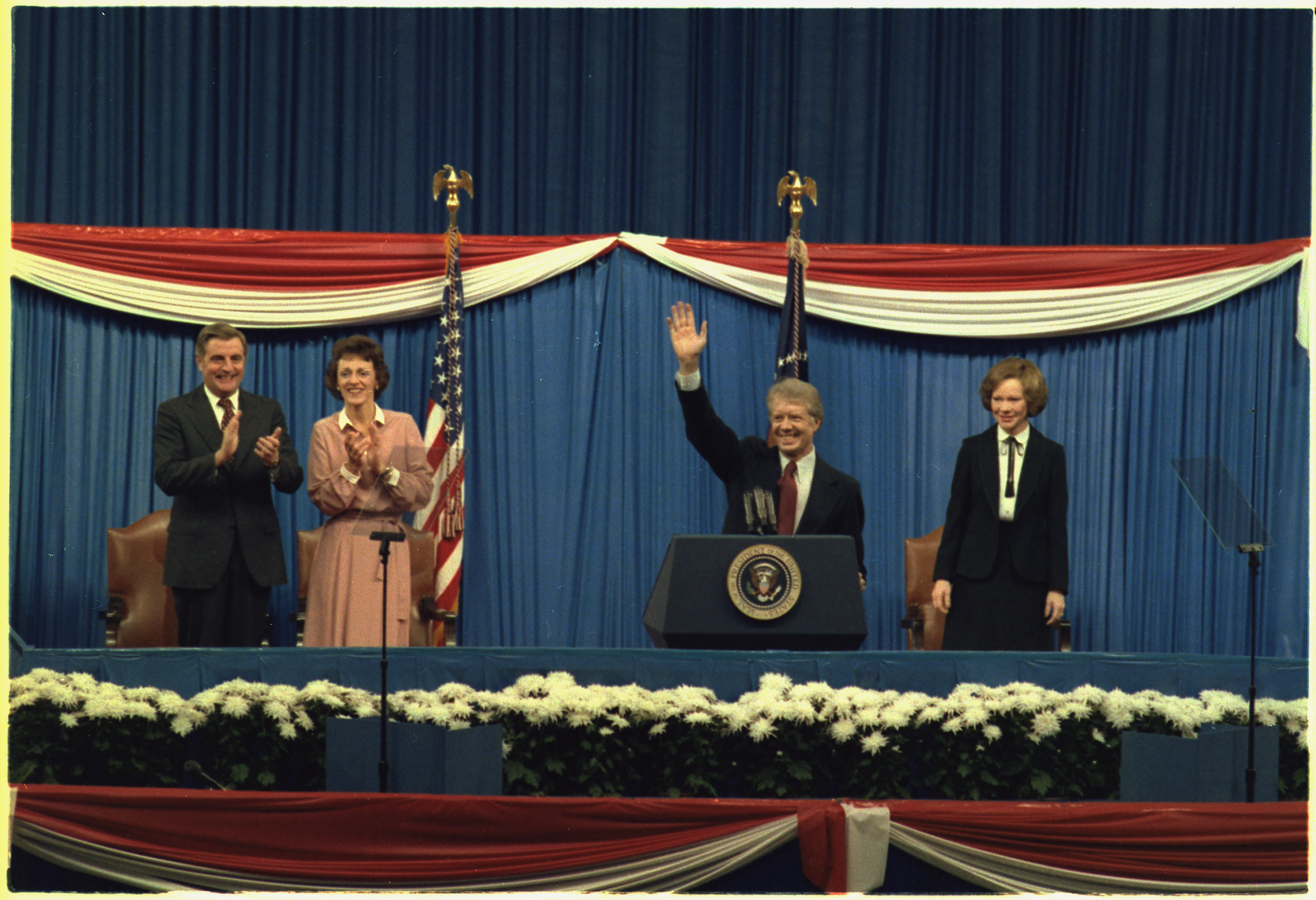
- President Carter, VP Mondale, and their wives at the conference

Convention
- Dates: December 7–10, 1978
- City: Memphis, Tennessee
- Venue: Cook Convention Center
- Total delegates: 1,633

The 1978 Democratic Midterm Conference a "mini convention" held by the Democratic Party following the 1978 midterm elections. It took place at the Cook Convention Center in Memphis, Tennessee, on December 7-10, 1978. At the time, the Democratic National Committee was in debt due to the cost of the Jimmy Carter 1976 presidential campaign.

Compared to the previous midterm conference held in Kansas City in 1974, the Democratic National Committee voted to cut the number of delegates to be credentialed at the 1978 conference to 1,633 delegates. The Democratic National Committee voted in favor of Memphis as the location, choosing it over Denver, Honolulu, and Seattle. President Jimmy Carter attended the event and delivered a keynote speech despite his polling numbers declining.

On December 9, Arkansas Attorney General, and then Arkansas Governor-elect, Bill Clinton moderated a health care panel meeting featuring Joe Califano, who was at the time serving in the Carter Administration as U.S. Secretary of Health, Education and Welfare, and Senator Ted Kennedy, who was by then a fierce critic of the Carter Administration's health care policy. During this panel meeting, Kennedy delivered a speech which not only discussed health care, and criticized the Carter administration's fiscal and economic policies. The speech by Kennedy was regarded to be rousing enough to upstage the remarks Carter delivered to the conference. Clinton noted in January 2001 that while he was at the time "a big supporter of Carter," Kennedy's speech during the health care panel meeting "made an impression on me that day that had lasted over these 22-plus years;" despite this, he and Kennedy would only become better acquainted in the time after he became U.S. President in 1993.

Journalists noted the quieter mood compared to 1974.
