= 1974 Conference on Democratic Policy and Organization =

1974 conference in Missouri

- 1974 United States elections
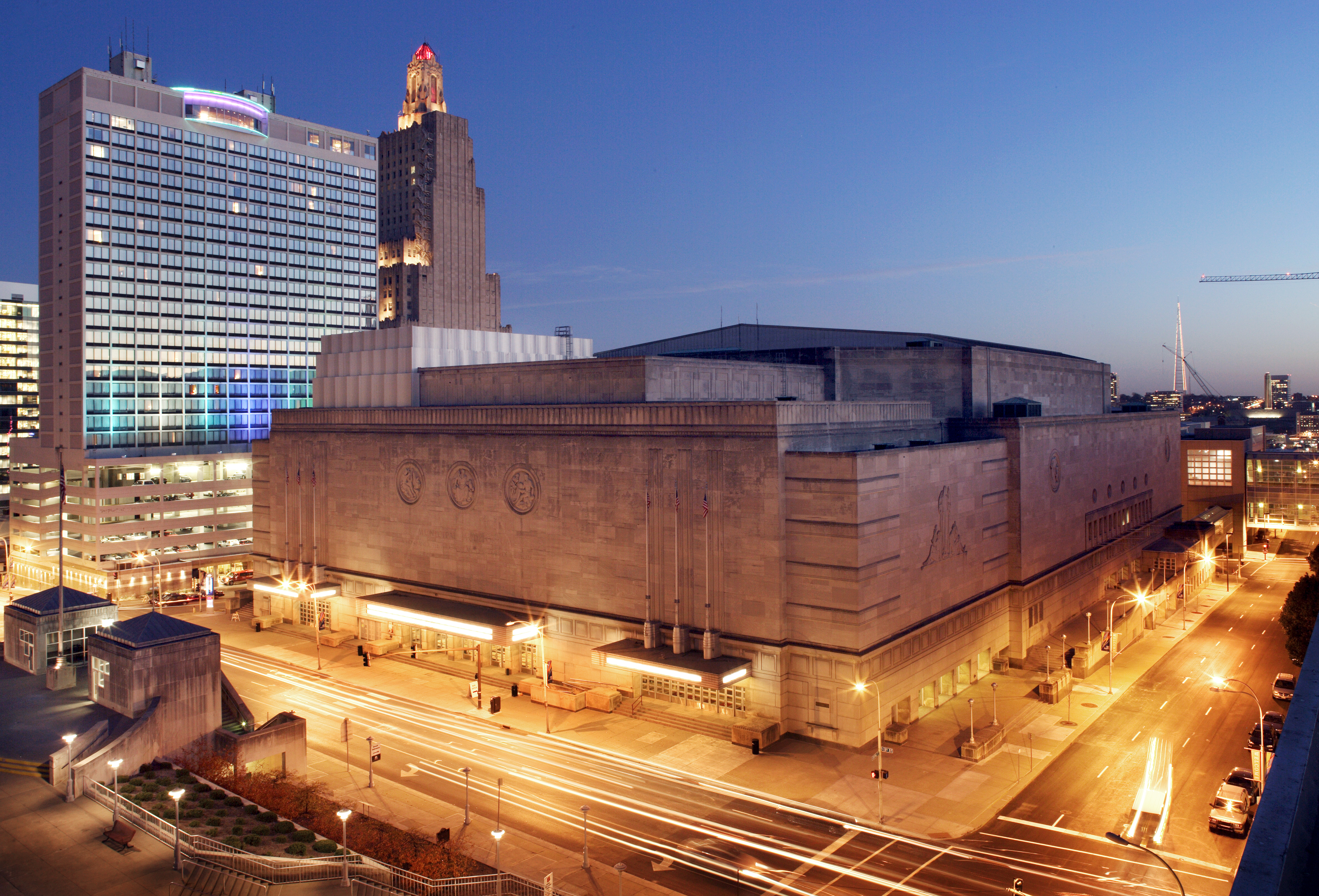
- Municipal Auditorium (convention venue), photographed in 2007

Convention
- Dates: December 6–8, 1974
- City: Kansas City, Missouri
- Venue: Municipal Auditorium
- Total delegates: 2,038

The 1974 Conference on Democratic Policy and Organization, also known as the 1974 Democratic National Midterm Conference, was held at the Municipal Auditorium in Kansas City, Missouri, on December 6–8, 1974. The official focus, as authorized by resolution at the 1972 Democratic National Convention, was to "consider and adopt a permanent Charter for the Democratic Party ... and such other matters as may be authorized by the Democratic National Committee". It is the only other delegated DNC convention or conference to be held in Kansas City besides the 1900 convention, as well as the most recent to be held in Missouri since the 1916 convention.

Compared to the much larger number of delegates elected to the DNC's presidential nominating conventions, the midterm conference credentialed 2,038 delegates elected from various conventions, caucuses and primaries.

== Preparation ==
The 1972 Democratic National Convention authorized the creation of two commissions: the Democratic Party Commission on New Delegate Selection and Party Structure (also known as the Mikulski Commission, named after its chair Barbara Mikulski), which solidified democratizing reforms to the national delegate selection process, and the Democratic Charter Commission, a 167-person Commission which produced a tentative party constitution, complete with seven alternative provisions submitted as minority reports, at its final meeting in August of 1974.

Robert S. Strauss, Chairman of the DNC, postponed the midterm conference from midsummer till December in order to avoid amplification of disputes among party activists ahead of the 1974 midterm elections. Prior to the conference, more than 30 Democratic governors and governors-elect met with party officials in Hilton Head Island, South Carolina on the weekend of November 16 to work out a truce between factions of the party. U.S. Representative Bella Abzug, in her role as head of the women's caucus of the New York State Democratic Party, pressed for more women delegates.

== Convention ==
The debate sessions of the conference were broadcast live on National Public Radio stations. The convention was attended by aspirants for the 1976 presidential primaries, including Terry Sanford, who also served as chair of the debate sessions, as well as Jimmy Carter, Lloyd Bentsen, Henry Jackson, Mo Udall, and George Wallace.

The conference adopted a formal "Statement of Economic Policy", which Time magazine described as more resembling the New Deal's economic focus over the social reforms of the Great Society.

On December 8, the final draft of the DNC charter was formally adopted by the conference. Containing 12 articles and over 3,500 words, it was the first charter ever adopted by the Democratic Party to govern the Democratic National Committee, and included the institutionalization of convention delegate selection, party officers, and a judicial council to arbitrate disputes. The debate over the charter was presided over by former North Carolina governor Terry Sanford.

A dispute arose over Section 6 of Article 10, which concerned whether to adopt affirmative action quotas to allow women and minority delegates to challenge delegate selection plans, which was opposed by labor union leaders and other members of the party's right wing, while a proposal to place the burden of proof on the claimant was received poorly by minority leaders, including Willie Brown. Eventually, a compromise on the issue was devised to remove the burden of proof, and the compromise language was adopted by floor vote, including from the majority of the Illinois delegation (despite the opposition of labor activists).

Delegates refused to mandate midterm conferences into the charter, with the vote failing 1,006 to 823, instead making such conferences optional. Delegate Payton McKnight argued against making the conferences permanent due to the $685,000 cost for the 1974 conference. Despite this, the DNC organized Midterm Conferences in 1978 and 1982.
