= Jimmy Carter 1980 presidential campaign =

American political campaign

Jimmy Carter for President 1980
- Campaign: 1980 Democratic primaries 1980 U.S. presidential election
- Candidate: Jimmy Carter; 39th President of the United States (1977–1981); Walter Mondale; 42nd Vice President of the United States (1977–1981)
- Affiliation: Democratic Party
- Status: Announced: December 4, 1979; Presumptive nominee: June 3, 1980; Official nominee: August 11, 1980; Lost election: November 4, 1980; Left office: January 20, 1981
- Slogan(s): A Tested and Trustworthy Team

In the 1980 United States presidential election, incumbent president Jimmy Carter and incumbent vice president Walter Mondale were defeated by Republican presidential nominee Ronald Reagan and vice presidential nominee George H. W. Bush.

President Carter launched his presidential re-election bid on December 4, 1979. He had low approval during his term; many people thought Carter mishandled the Iran hostage crisis, inflation, and severe economic downturn. In the 1980 Democratic Party presidential primaries, he was challenged by U.S. senator Ted Kennedy, whose campaign was formally launched on November 7, 1979. Carter lost 12 states and Washington, D.C., but won the remaining states and received the Democratic nomination with 1,984 delegates on August 11, 1980.

Reagan and Bush challenged Carter and Mondale in the general election. Reagan talked the most about the hostage crisis and the economy. In the second debate between Carter and Reagan, Reagan openly criticized him over the crisis; some said it was for that reason that Carter lost the election. On November 4, Carter was defeated in a landslide by Reagan, receiving 49 electoral votes and 41 percent of the popular vote.

== Background ==
Jimmy Carter, born in Plains, Georgia, the 39th president of the United States at that time, served in the United States Navy and passed the United States Naval Academy. He then ran for the Georgia State Senate and was successful. In 1971, he participated and continued to win, elected Governor of Georgia. Carter's family history was once a traditional farmer.

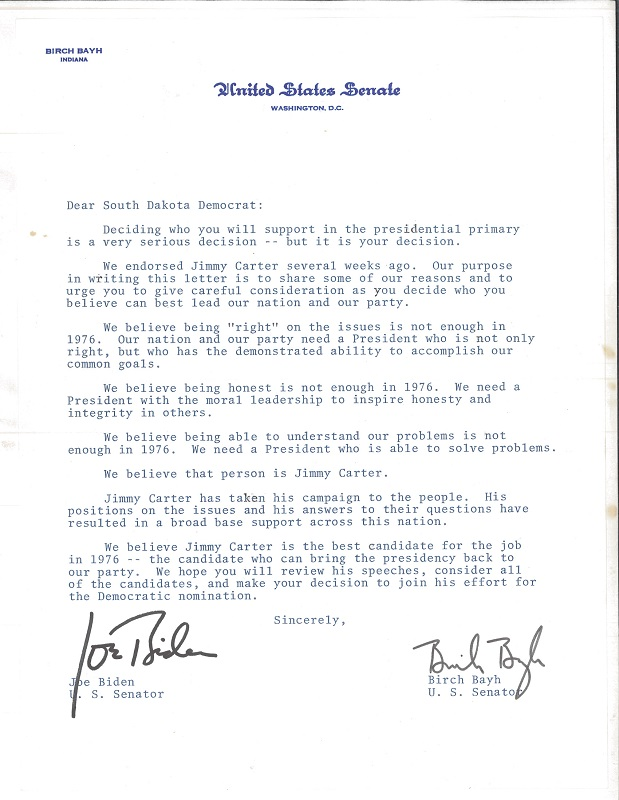
Birch Bayh and Joe Biden's letter support Jimmy Carter's 1976 presidential campaign

Carter participated in his first presidential campaign on December 12, 1974, he participated in the 1976 Democratic Party presidential primaries, as a dark horse candidate who was barely known outside of Georgia and he defeated all his opponents with 1,130 delegates, he was then nominated in the 1980 Democratic National Convention, during his 1976 campaign, he challenged then-president Gerald Ford over the Vietnam War and the economy as well as the quality of people's lives at that time.

Carter debated with Ford three times from September 23 – October 22, 1976, after the debate, he then won the U.S. presidential election on November 2, 1976, with 297 electoral votes and 50.1% popular votes, was one of the elections with the most disparate vote rates. He assumed the presidency on January 20, 1977, and served in the White House for four years before Ronald Reagan defeated him on November 4, 1980, and took office on January 20, 1981.

== Nomination ==
=== 1980 Democratic primaries ===
In the Democratic presidential primaries, Carter faced a viable candidate, Senator Ted Kennedy. Kennedy addressed the crisis in Iran, rising oil prices and economic stagnation. He also spoke about the low approval ratings of the Carter administration towards the end of its term. In response, Carter said that if Kennedy ran against him in primary election, he would "kick his ass". In the Massachusetts primary, Carter lost to Kennedy with 34 delegates compared to Kennedy's 78 delegates, this was a setback for Carter and he became the most recent president to lose a state primary until President Joe Biden lost to Jason Palmer in American Samoa, although he still won most of the states and only missed 12 states and Washington D.C..

After the Democratic primaries ended, Carter received a total of 1,984 delegates and 51.1% popular votes compared to Kennedy with about 1,237 delegates and 37.6% popular votes, this was one of the rare times that a sitting president won. lose the most delegates to others, as well as the number of popular votes, because Carter's approval numbers at the end of his term remained very low.

=== 1980 Democratic National Convention ===
After winning the Democratic primaries, Carter was re-nominated at the Democratic National Convention in Madison Square Garden, New York City, where he again chose Walter Mondale as his vice presidential running mate, Although he chose Mondale to be vice president, Mondale still had to go to the election round in 1980, this would also be the last time the Democratic Party voted to elect a vice president but faced opposition, Mondale received 2,429 delegates.

The 1980 convention was notable as it was the last time in the 20th century, for either major party, that a candidate tried to get delegates released from their voting commitments, done by Ted Kennedy. Kennedy spoke on August 12 and gave a speech in support of President Jimmy Carter and the Democratic Party. Kennedy's famous speech finally ended with the lines: "For me, a few hours ago, this campaign ended. For all those whose concern is the concern of us, the work continues, the cause lives on, the hope lives on, and the dream will never die." His speech was written by Bob Shrum.

President Carter gave his speech accepting the party's nomination on August 14. This was notable for his gaffe intended to be a tribute to Hubert Humphrey, whom he referred to as "Hubert Horatio Hornblower". Carter received 2,123 delegates, Kennedy 1,151, Proxmire 10 and other candidates received under 6 delegates. The total were 3,315 delegates.

== Main competitor ==
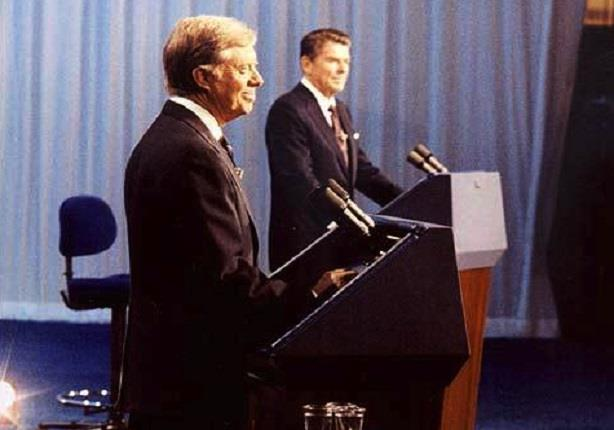
President Carter and presidential candidate Reagan debating on October 28, 1980, in Cleveland, Ohio.

Ronald Reagan, a member of the Republican Party as well as former Governor of California and an actor, announced his 1980 presidential campaign on November 13, 1979, after which he participated in the presidential primaries of the Republican Party and won 1,407 delegates, he then chose George H. W. Bush as vice president at the 1980 Republican National Convention, where he won the nomination to face Carter in the 1980 general election and would be inaugurated on January 20, 1981. Reagan frequently criticized Carter for the crisis in Iran, economic stagnation, rising inflation, and falling approval ratings. Carter criticized Reagan's age and his indiscretions, saying "he lacks the connection with his home California voter base to oppose him", Carter also added that Reagan "is a warmonger and cannot be trusted with his nuclear arsenal". Carter attempted to deny Reagan's campaign $29.4 million (equivalent to $108,718,255 in 2023) in campaign funds, dependent on conservative groups that raised $60 million to help he was elected—an amount exceeding the campaign fund limit. Carter's effort was later rejected by the Federal Election Commission.

== Endorsements ==
Here are the lists of Carter supporters in the presidential primaries:

List of Jimmy Carter endorsements

U.S. Senators

- Senator Lloyd Bentsen of Texas
- Senator Joe Biden of Delaware
- Senator Bill Bradley of New Jersey
- Senator Lawton Chiles of Florida
- Senator Thomas Eagleton of Missouri
- Senator John Glenn of Ohio
- Senator Howell Heflin of Alabama
- Senator Fritz Hollings of South Carolina
- Senator Henry M. Jackson of Washington
- Senator Ted Kennedy of Massachusetts
- Senator Carl Levin of Michigan
- Senator Warren Magnuson of Washington
- Senator Robert Burren Morgan of North Carolina
- Senator Daniel Patrick Moynihan of New York
- Senator Gaylord Nelson of Wisconsin
- Senator David Pryor of Arkansas
- Senator Don Riegle of Michigan
- Senator Jim Sasser of Tennessee
- Senator Donald Stewart of Alabama
- Former Senator James Eastland of Mississippi
- Former Senator Albert Gore Sr. of Tennessee
- Former Senator John Sparkman of Alabama
- Former Senator Ralph Yarborough of Texas

U.S. Representatives

- Representative Joseph P. Addabbo of New York
- Representative Donald J. Albosta of Michigan
- Representative Beryl Anthony Jr. of Arkansas
- Representative Thomas L. Ashley of Ohio
- Representative Eugene Atkinson of Pennsylvania
- Representative Tom Bevill of Alabama
- Representative Mario Biaggi of New York
- Representative William M. Brodhead of Michigan
- Representative Jack Brooks of Texas
- Representative Bill Boner of Tennessee
- Representative Butler Derrick of South Carolina
- Representative Shirley Chisholm of New York
- Representative Bob Eckhardt of Texas
- Representative Don Edwards of California
- Representative Geraldine Ferraro of New York
- Representative Ronnie Flippo of Alabama
- Representative William D. Ford of Michigan
- Representative Harold Ford Sr. of Tennessee
- Representative Martin Frost of Texas
- Representative Kika de la Garza of Texas
- Representative Henry B. Gonzalez of Texas
- Representative Al Gore of Tennessee
- Representative William H. Gray III of Pennsylvania
- Representative Sam B. Hall Jr. of Texas
- Representative Kenneth Lamar Holland of South Carolina
- Representative Elizabeth Holtzman of New York
- Representative Ed Jones of Tennessee
- Representative Abraham Kazen of Texas
- Representative Dale Kildee of Michigan
- Representative Marvin Leath of Texas
- Representative Mickey Leland of Texas
- Representative Marilyn Lloyd of Tennessee
- Representative Jim Mattox of Texas
- Representative Norman Mineta of California
- Representative Joseph Minish of New Jersey
- Representative Parren Mitchell of Maryland
- Representative Stephen L. Neal of North Carolina
- Representative Tip O’Neill of Massachusetts
- Representative Edward J. Patten of New Jersey
- Representative Don Pease of Ohio
- Representative Charles Rangel of New York
- Representative Peter W. Rodino of New Jersey
- Representative Benjamin Rosenthal of New York
- Representative Richard Shelby of Alabama
- Representative Paul Simon of Illinois
- Representative Charles Stenholm of Texas
- Representative J. Bob Traxler of Michigan
- Representative Harold Volkmer of Missouri
- Representative Robert A. Young of Missouri
- Representative Doug Walgren of Pennsylvania
- Representative Charlie Wilson of Texas
- Representative Clement Zablocki of Wisconsin
- Former Representative Omar Burleson of Texas
- Former Representative William Jennings Bryan Dorn of South Carolina
- Former Representative Carl Elliott of Alabama
- Former Representative Robert E. Jones Jr. of Alabama
- Former Representative William R. Poage of Texas
- Former Representative Albert Rains of Alabama

Federal Officials

- United States Secretary of Agriculture Bob Bergland

Governors

- Governor Brendan Byrne of New Jersey
- Governor Hugh Carey of New York
- Governor Bill Clinton of Arkansas
- Governor Bob Graham of Florida
- Governor Jim Hunt of North Carolina
- Governor Fob James of Alabama
- Governor Edward J. King of Massachusetts
- Governor George Nigh of Oklahoma
- Governor Dixy Lee Ray of Washington
- Governor Richard Riley of South Carolina
- Governor Joseph P. Teasdale of Missouri
- Governor William F. Winter of Mississippi
- Former Governor Reubin Askew of Florida
- Former Governor Martin J. Schreiber of Wisconsin
- Former Governor George Wallace of Alabama

State Officials

- Auditor General Al Benedict of Pennsylvania
- State Representative Mary O. Boyle of Ohio
- Secretary of State Anthony J. Celebrezze, Jr., of Ohio
- Lieutenant Governor Mario Cuomo of New York
- Secretary of State Alan J. Dixon of Illinois
- Treasurer Gertrude Donahey of Ohio
- Stanley Fink Speaker of the New York State Assembly
- Lieutenant Governor Robert Louis Freeman Sr. of Louisiana
- Lieutenant Governor William P. Hobby Jr. of Texas
- Jim McDermott Washington state senator
- Lieutenant Governor George McMillan of Alabama
- Ned McWherter List of speakers of the Tennessee House of Representatives
- State Senate president Oliver Ocasek of Ohio
- Liz J. Patterson South Carolina state senator
- Secretary of State Vel Phillips of Wisconsin
- Lieutenant Governor John Shelton Wilder of Tennessee

Municipal Officials

- Mayor Jane Byrne of Chicago
- Mayor William J. Green III of Philadelphia
- Mayor Janet Gray Hayes of San Jose
- Mayor Henry Maier of Milwaukee
- Mayor William Donald Schaefer of Baltimore
- Mayor Kevin White of Boston

Individuals

- Baptist minister Cameron M. Alexander of Antioch Baptist Church North
- Boxer Muhammad Ali
- Singer Johnny Cash
- Sol Chaikin, President of International Ladies Garment Workers Union
- Singer Charlie Daniels
- Singer Larry Gatlin
- Singer Tom T. Hall
- Coretta Scott King civil rights activist
- Martin Luther King Sr. father of Martin Luther King Jr.
- Lane Kirkland, President of the AFL-CIO
- Houston Astros pitcher Joe Niekro
- Singer Willie Nelson
- Baptist pastor Joseph L. Roberts Jr. of Ebenezer Baptist Church
- Houston Astros pitcher Joe Sambito
- Albert Shanker, President of the American Federation of Teachers
- Musician Hank Snow
- Gospel group Speer Family

== Polling ==
In Democratic primaries:

=== National polling ===
Poll source	Publication	Jerry Brown	Jimmy Carter	Ted Kennedy	Other	Undecided
Gallup	April 1978	12%	29%	36%	16%	7%
Gallup	July 1978	11%	20%	44%	16%	9%
Gallup	September 1978	8%	34%	39%	12%	7%
Gallup	November 1978	10%	32%	58%	–	
Gallup	April 1979	9%	31%	58%	2%	
Gallup	June 1979	8%	17%	52%	9%	14%
Gallup	June 1979	9%	22%	54%	6%	9%
Gallup	July 1979	9%	21%	53%	16%	1%
Gallup	November 1979	9%	34%	51%	6%	
Gallup	November 1979	8%	32%	39%	5%	16%
Gallup	December 1979	–	46%	42%	12%	
Gallup	January 1980	–	51%	37%	12%	
Gallup	January 1980	–	63%	24%	13%	
Gallup	February 1980	–	61%	32%	7%	
Gallup	March 1980	–	66%	27%	7%	
Gallup	March 1980	–	60%	28%	12%	
Gallup	March 1980	–	59%	31%	10%	
Gallup	April 1980	–	53%	33%	14%	
Gallup	May 1980	–	51%	36%	13%	
Gallup	May 1980	–	58%	31%	11%	
Gallup	July 1980	–	60%	34%	6%	
Gallup	August 1980	–	48%	38%	14%	

== Election day ==
Map of the 1980 U.S. presidential election, red represents Reagan winning that state, blue represents Carter winning that state/district.

On November 4, 1980, Carter lost the election to Republican nominee Ronald Reagan. Reagan won 489 electoral votes and 50.8% of the popular vote while Carter only received 49 electoral votes and 41.0% of the popular vote. Reagan carried 44 states while Carter only carried 6 states with Washington D.C., this is one of the elections where the presidential candidate defeated the incumbent president in a landslide, Carter only kept Georgia, Minnesota, Washington D.C., Rhode Island, West Virginia and Hawaii for him.

Before the election, Carter and Reagan debated in Cleveland, Ohio on October 28, 1980, where the two talked about military, economics, inflation, politics, and the hostage crisis in Iran, Reagan later famously said during the debate which "Are you better off than you were four years ago?" to refer to inflation and Carter's economy compared to four years ago when it was worse.

=== Results ===
Electoral results
Presidential candidate	Party	Home state	Popular vote		Electoral vote	Running mate		
Presidential candidate	Party	Home state	Count	Percentage	Electoral vote	Vice-presidential candidate	Home state	Electoral vote
Ronald Reagan	Republican	California	43,903,230	50.75%	489	George H. W. Bush	Texas	489
Jimmy Carter (incumbent)	Democratic	Georgia	35,480,115	41.01%	49	Walter Mondale (incumbent)	Minnesota	49
John B. Anderson	Independent	Illinois	5,719,850	6.61%	0	Patrick Lucey	Wisconsin	0
Ed Clark	Libertarian	California	921,128	1.06%	0	David Koch	Kansas	0
Barry Commoner	Citizens	Missouri	233,052	0.27%	0	LaDonna Harris	Oklahoma	0
Gus Hall	Communist	New York	44,933	0.05%	0	Angela Davis	California	0
John Rarick	American Independent	Louisiana	40,906	0.05%	0	Eileen Shearer	California	0
Clifton DeBerry	Socialist Workers	California	38,738	0.04%	0	Matilde Zimmermann	New York	0
Ellen McCormack	Right to Life	New York	32,320	0.04%	0	Carroll Driscoll	New Jersey	0
Maureen Smith	Peace and Freedom	California	18,116	0.02%	0	Elizabeth Cervantes Barron	California	0
Other			77,290	0.09%	—	Other		—
Total			86,509,678	100%	538			538
Needed to win					270			270

Source – Official 1980 Presidential Election Results

== Aftermath ==
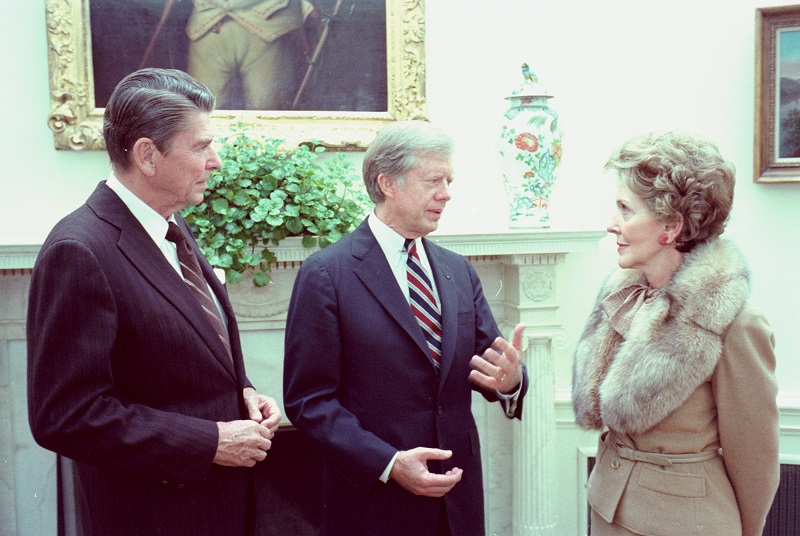
Outgoing President Carter meets with President-elect Ronald Reagan and Nancy Reagan.

After Carter's 1980 campaign failed he became involved in many national and international public policy, conflict resolution, human rights, and philanthropic activities through the Carter Foundation. Carter was awarded the Nobel Peace Prize in 2002 for his post-presidential work in finding peaceful solutions to international conflicts. Mondale in other hand, he went on to launch his own campaign as the Democratic nominee four years later in 1984, but lost to Reagan.

Carter and Reagan both lived post-presidency for more than 15 years. When Reagan died in 2004 due to his worsening Alzheimer's disease, Carter attended his funeral.

Carter was the oldest-lived former president, at 100 years of age, at the time of his death on December 29, 2024.

== See also ==
- 1980 Democratic Party presidential primaries
- 1980 Democratic National Convention
- 1980 United States presidential election
- Ronald Reagan 1980 presidential campaign
- Ted Kennedy 1980 presidential campaign
- Jimmy Carter 1976 presidential campaign
- Presidency of Jimmy Carter
