= Gerald Ford 1976 presidential campaign =

American political campaign

Gerald Ford for President 1976
- Campaign: 1976 Republican primaries 1976 U.S. presidential election
- Candidate: Gerald Ford; 38th President of the United States (1974–1977); Bob Dole; U.S. Senator from Kansas (1969–1996)
- Affiliation: Republican Party
- Status: Announced: July 8, 1975; Official nominee: August 19, 1976; Election day: November 2, 1976; Projected defeat: November 3, 1976; Left office: January 20, 1977
- Key people: Bo Callaway (first campaign manager); Rogers Morton (second campaign manager); James Baker (third campaign manager)
- Slogan: He's making us proud again
- Theme song: "I'm Feeling Good About America" by Robert K. Gardner

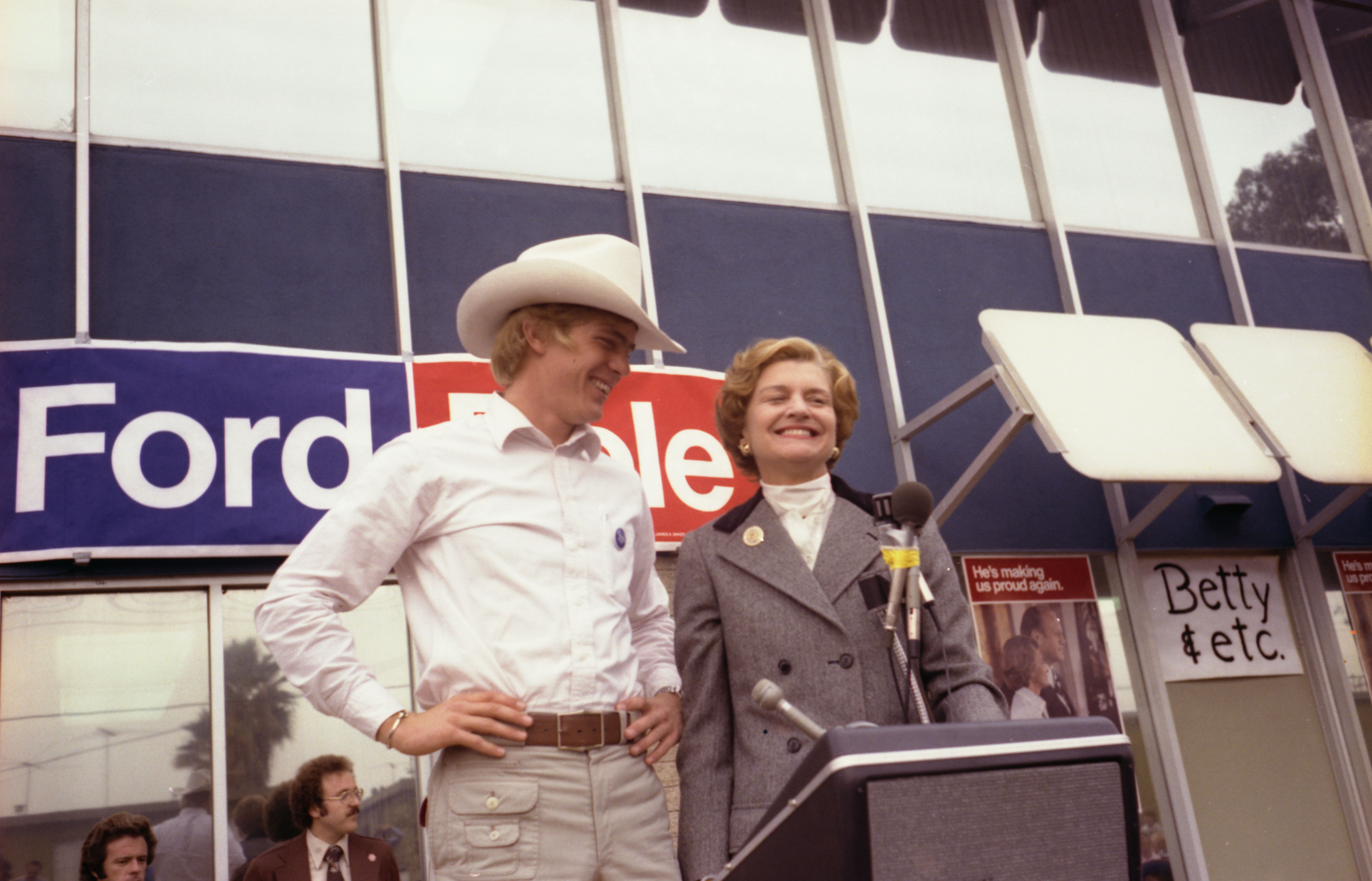
Steven Ford with his mother, Betty Ford, in 1976 during the presidential campaign.

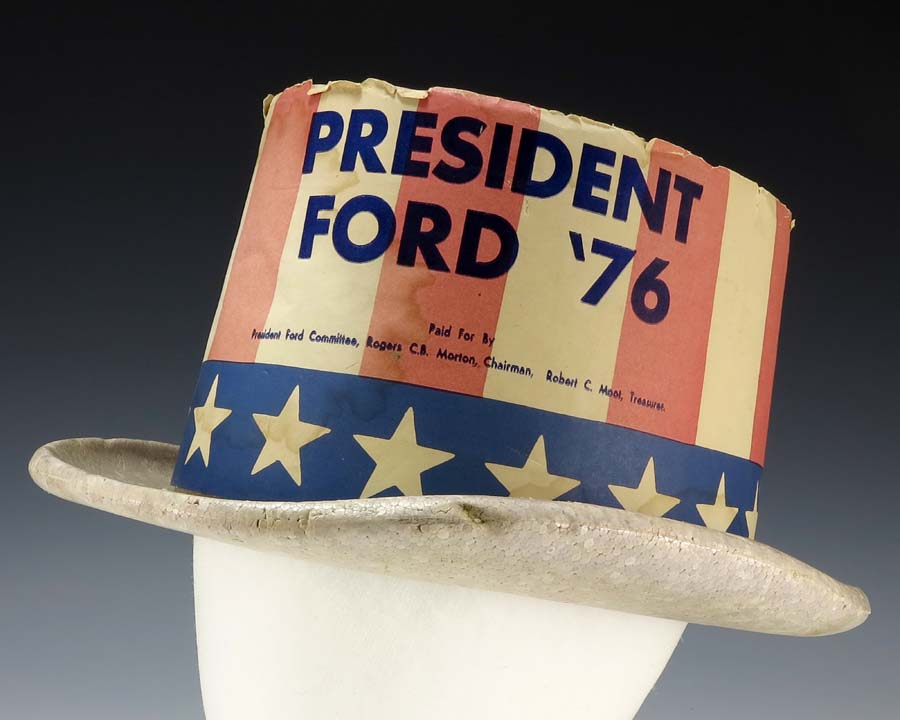
Foam campaign hat

The 1976 presidential campaign of Gerald Ford was an unsuccessful election campaign for the 1976 United States presidential election by incumbent president Gerald Ford, who had taken office on August 9, 1974, upon the resignation of Richard Nixon. Ford and his running mate, Senator Bob Dole, were defeated by Democratic presidential nominee Jimmy Carter and vice presidential nominee Walter Mondale. Ford, a Republican president and former vice president under Nixon, launched his presidential bid on July 8, 1975, and secured nomination for his election to a full term on August 19, 1976. He was challenged in the Republican primaries by former California governor Ronald Reagan from his campaign which was formally launched on November 20, 1975, received more than forty percent of the delegates in the Republican National Convention, but Ford got more votes than Reagan. Reagan would later be elected president in 1980.

Ford's tenure marked America's fall into a dark period, with a stagnant economy and effects after the Vietnam War (or Vietnam syndrome). Ford pardoned Nixon in the Watergate scandal, which many people believe to be the reason for which Ford lost to his opponent Jimmy Carter in the 1976 presidential election. In the Republican primaries, Ford received 1,121 delegates while needing 1,130 votes to win. Ronald Reagan was one of those who stood in the way of Ford winning the nomination with Reagan receiving 1,078 delegates, this was one of the most controversial primaries ever, as well as the difference in votes of delegates and popular votes.

However, Ford still received the Republican nomination on August 19, 1976, to face Democratic candidate Jimmy Carter on November 2, 1976. Carter defeated Ford, receiving 297 electoral votes and 50.1% of the popular vote. Had he won, Ford would become the third Republican vice president to ascend the presidency and then win a full term, after Theodore Roosevelt and Calvin Coolidge, while Dole would become the second vice president from Kansas, after Charles Curtis.

Carter took office on January 20, 1977, and held power for four years before Reagan defeated him in 1980 and took office on January 20, 1981. Ford joined his vice presidential running mate Bob Dole on the campaign trail.

== Background ==
Gerald Ford, born July 14, 1913, in Omaha, Nebraska, his maternal grandfather was Illinois politician and businessman Levi Addison Gardner and his paternal grandfather was banker and businessman Charles Henry King, Ford's parents separated Just sixteen days after his birth and his mother took the infant Ford to Oak Park, Illinois, Ford later said his biological father had a history of beating his mother.

Ford attended the University of Michigan. Ford graduated from Michigan in 1935 with a bachelor's degree in economics. He turned down offers from the Detroit Lions and Green Bay Packers of the National Football League. Instead, he took a job in September 1935 as a boxing coach and assistant football coach at Yale University and applied to its law school.

Ford joined the United States Navy after the Imperial Japanese attacked on Pearl Harbor, some time later, Ford joined the U.S. House of Representatives, where he met President Lyndon Johnson in 1963. After the resignation of Spiro Agnew, he was confirmed to become Nixon's vice president in December 1973 until he ascended to the presidency on August 9, 1974, when Nixon resigned, becoming the only president in American history to have never been elected president or vice president.

== Nomination ==
=== 1976 Republican primaries ===
Ford launched his campaign on July 8, 1975, after which he entered the Republican primaries, where his rival, Ronald Reagan, opened his campaign on November 20, 1975. Ford and Reagan faced each other intensely, with Ford ultimately receiving more votes than Reagan, even though the required number of votes was 1,130 votes. This is also one of the few times an incumbent president has lost state primaries, the most recent being when President Joe Biden lost to Jason Palmer in American Samoa after 44 years when President Jimmy Carter lost to Ted Kennedy in Massachusetts on March 4, 1980, and 11 states with Washington D.C.

In the New Hampshire primary, Ford attacked Reagan's plan to cut $90 billion from the federal budget, as well as Reagan's plans for Social Security. Reagan's stump speeches included attacks on welfare queens, as well as other attacks on government welfare programs, Reagan then lost the primaries with 1,317 delegates remaining.

=== 1976 Republican National Convention ===
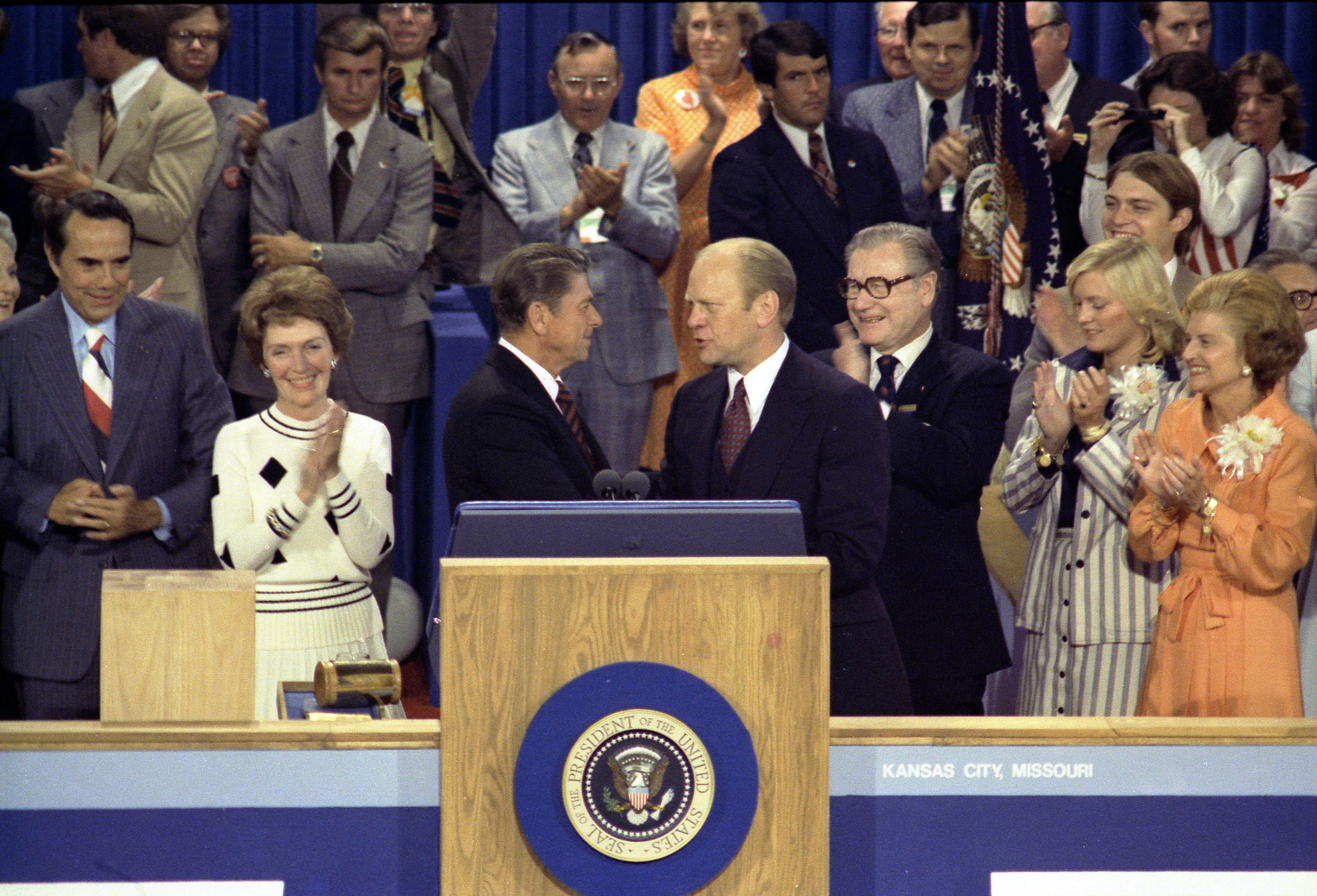
President Ford shakes hands with Ronald Reagan in the Republican National Convention

After defeating their strongest opponents, Ford and Vice President Bob Dole were nominated at the Republican National Convention in Kansas City, Missouri, where Reagan criticized Ford for his signing of the Helsinki Accords and indirectly blamed him for the fall of Saigon in April 1975. The Convention voted, Ford received 1,187 votes and Reagan received 1,070 votes, another candidate, Elliot Richardson, received only 1 vote, this was one of the biggest controversies at the Republican convention about choosing a presidential candidate in a time of crisis. For the vice presidential candidate, Bob Dole received 1,921 votes, with an overwhelming margin of 85.04%. Ronald Reagan was also in this, but he only received 27 votes, the third lowest after Jesse Helms when he received 103 votes, the remaining candidates received less than 25 votes. Reagan then delivered a speech that caused a stir, eclipsing Ford's own acceptance speech, despite being just over five minutes long. Some delegates later said they left the convention wondering if they had voted for the wrong candidate. Reagan's concession speech spoke of the dangers of nuclear war and the threat from the Soviet Union.

== Main competitor ==
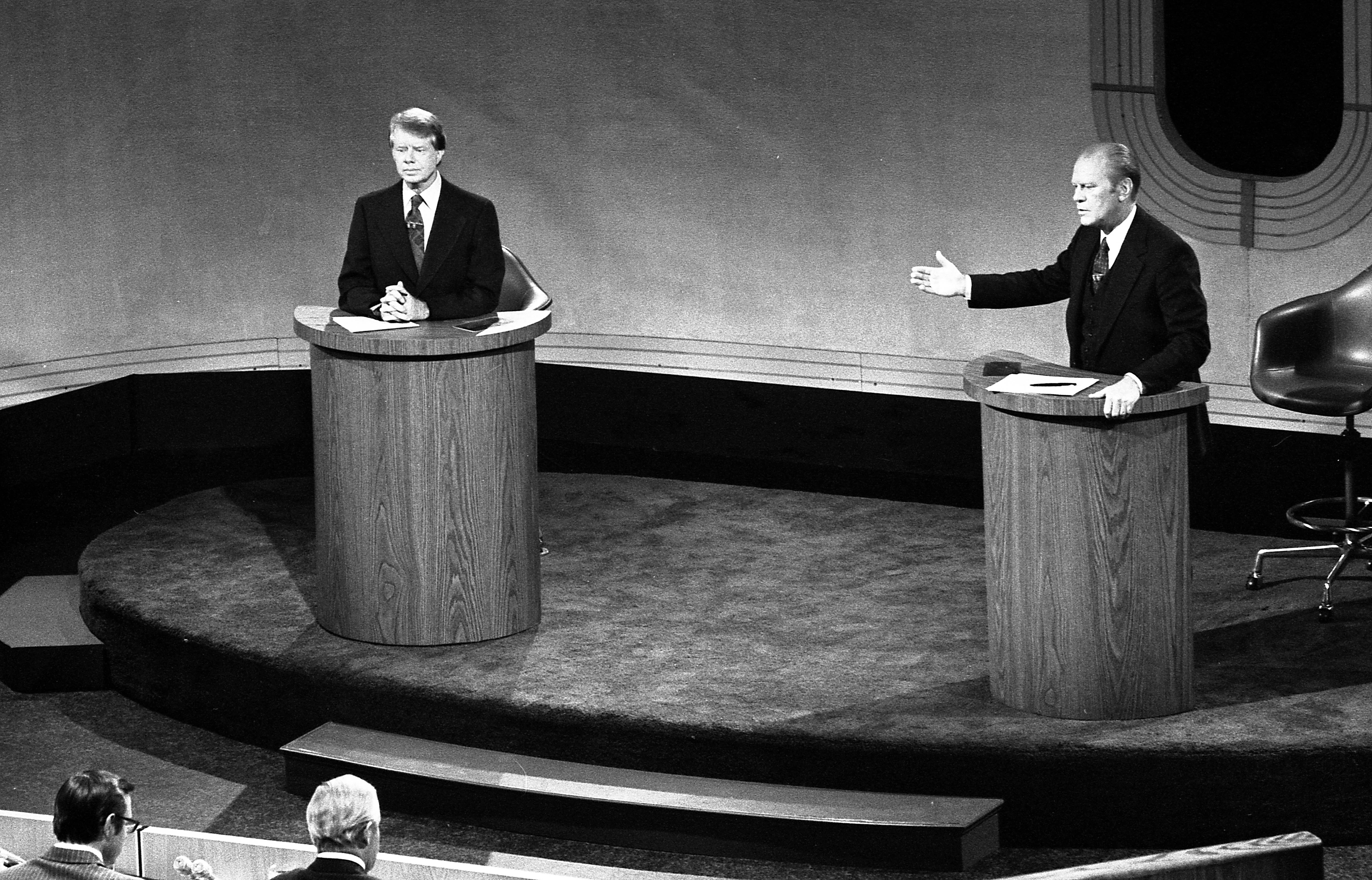
President Ford and presidential candidate Carter debating on September 23, 1976, in Philadelphia, Pennsylvania.

Jimmy Carter, a member of the Democratic Party as well as former Governor of Georgia and a peanut farmer, announced his 1976 presidential campaign on December 12, 1974, after which he participated in the presidential primaries of the Democratic Party and won 1,130 delegates, he then chose Walter Mondale as vice president at the 1976 Democratic National Convention, where he won the nomination to face Ford in the 1976 general election and would be inaugurated on January 20, 1977.

== Endorsements ==
Here are the lists of Ford supporters in the presidential primaries:

List of Gerald Ford endorsements

Federal Officials

- Nelson Rockefeller Vice President of the United States

Former Federal Officials

- Earl Butz former United States Secretary of Agriculture (1971–1976)
- John Connally former United States Secretary of the Treasury (1971–1972)
- Rogers Morton former Counselor to the President (1976)

Senators

- Howard Baker (R-TN)
- Dewey F. Bartlett (R-OK)
- Henry Bellmon (R-OK)
- James L. Buckley (C-NY)
- Clifford Case (R-NJ)
- Carl Curtis (R-NE)
- Bob Dole (R-KS)
- Robert P. Griffin (R-MI)
- Mark Hatfield (R-OR)
- Roman Hruska (R-NE)
- Jacob Javits (R-NY)
- Paul Laxalt (R-NV)
- Bob Packwood (R-OR)
- James B. Pearson (R-KS)
- Charles H. Percy (R-IL)
- Richard Schweiker (R-PA)
- Robert Taft Jr. (R-OH)
- Strom Thurmond (R-SC)
- John Tower (R-TX)
- Lowell Weicker (R-CT)

Former Senators

- George Aiken (R-VT)
- Gordon Allott (R-CO)
- Wallace F. Bennett (R-UT)
- J. Caleb Boggs (R-DE)
- John W. Bricker (R-OH)
- Henry Cabot Lodge Jr. (R-MA)
- Harry P. Cain (R-WA)
- Homer Capehart (R-IN)
- Frank Carlson (R-KS)
- Marlow Cook (R-KY)
- John Sherman Cooper (R-KY)
- Norris Cotton (R-NH)
- Homer S. Ferguson (R-MI)
- Len Jordan (R-ID)
- Thomas Kuchel (R-CA)
- Frank Lausche (D-OH)
- Jack Miller (R-IA)
- Thruston Morton (R-KY)
- George Murphy (R-CA)
- Leverett Saltonstall (R-MA)
- Milward Simpson (R-WY)

Representatives

- John B. Anderson (R-IL)
- Bill Archer (R-TX)
- John M. Ashbrook (R-OH)
- Skip Bafalis (R-FL)
- Alphonzo E. Bell Jr. (R-CA)
- Edward G. Biester Jr. (R-PA)
- William Broomfield (R-MI)
- Bud Brown (R-OH)
- Jim Broyhill (R-NC)
- John Hall Buchanan Jr. (R-AL)
- Al Cederberg (R-MI)
- Clair Burgener (R-CA)
- Donald D. Clancy (R-OH)
- Don Clausen (R-CA)
- James Colgate Cleveland (R-NH)
- Thad Cochran (R-MS)
- Barber Conable (R-NY)
- Lawrence Coughlin (R-PA)
- Phil Crane (R-IL)
- Samuel L. Devine (R-OH)
- William L. Dickinson (R-AL)
- Jack Edwards (R-AL)
- Millicent Fenwick (R-NJ)
- Paul Findley (R-IL)
- Edwin B. Forsythe (R-NJ)
- Bill Frenzel (R-MN)
- Lou Frey (R-FL)
- Marvin Esch (R-MI)
- Benjamin Gilman (R-NY)
- Barry Goldwater Jr. (R-CA)
- Bill Gradison (R-OH)
- Chuck Grassley (R-IA)
- Tennyson Guyer (R-OH)
- Tom Hagedorn (R-MI)
- Bill Harsha (R-OH)
- Elwood Hillis (R-IN)
- Frank Horton (R-NY)
- Guy Vander Jagt (R-MI)
- John Jarman (R-OK)
- Tom Kindness (R-OH)
- Del Latta (R-OH)
- Trent Lott (R-KS)
- Ed Madigan (R-IL)
- Robert McClory (R-IL)
- Pete McCloskey (R-CA)
- Stewart McKinney (R-CT)
- Charles Adams Mosher (R-OH)
- Henson Moore (R-LA)
- Carlos Moorhead (R-CA)
- John T. Myers (R-IN)
- Ron Paul (R-TX)
- Joel Pritchard (R-WA)
- Al Quie (R-MN)
- Jimmy Quillen (R-TN)
- Ralph Regula (R-OH)
- Matthew J. Rinaldo (R-NJ)
- J. Kenneth Robinson (R-VA)
- John H. Rousselot (R-CA)
- Ronald A. Sarasin (R-CT)
- Dick Schulze (R-PA)
- Keith Sebelius (R-KS)
- Bud Shuster (R-PA)
- Gene Snyder (R-KY)
- Floyd Spence (R-SC)
- J. William Stanton (R-OH)
- Tom Steed (D-OK)
- Alan Steelman (R-TX)
- Dave Treen (R-LA)
- Richard Vander Veen (R-MI)
- Charles W. Whalen Jr. (R-OH)
- Charles E. Wiggins (R-CA)
- Bob Wilson (R-CA)
- Chalmers Wylie (R-OH)
- Bill Young (R-FL)

Former Representatives

- E. Ross Adair (R-IN)
- Glenn Andrews (R-AL)
- William Hanes Ayres (R-OH)
- LaMar Baker (R-TN)
- James F. Battin (R-MT)
- Page Belcher (R-OK)
- E. Y. Berry (R-SD)
- Jackson Edward Betts (R-OH)
- Benjamin B. Blackburn (R-GA)
- Frances P. Bolton (R-OH)
- William G. Bray (R-IN)
- Donald G. Brotzman (R-CO)
- Joel Broyhill (R-VA)
- D. Emmert Brumbaugh (R-PA)
- Hamer Budge (R-ID)
- George H. W. Bush (R-TX)
- John W. Byrnes (R-WI)
- Bo Callaway (R-GA)
- John Newbold Camp (R-OK)
- John Chenoweth (R-CO)
- Harold Collier (R-IL)
- William M. Colmer (D-MS)
- William Sheldrick Conover (R-PA)
- Sam Coon (R-OR)
- William C. Cramer (R-FL)
- Paul W. Cronin (R-MA)
- Glenn Cunningham (R-NE)
- Glenn R. Davis (R-WI)
- John R. Dellenback (R-OR)
- Robert V. Denney (R-NE)
- David W. Dennis (R-IN)
- Edwin Durno (R-OR)
- Charles H. Elston (R-OH)
- Hamilton Fish III (R-NY)
- O. C. Fisher (D-TX)
- Harold V. Froelich, (R-WI)
- Ed Foreman (R-NM)
- Ezekiel C. Gathings (D-AR)
- Edith Green (D-OR)
- Ezekiel C. Gathings (D-AR)
- George A. Goodling (R-PA)
- James R. Grover Jr. (R-NY)
- Charles Gubser (R-CA)
- G. Elliott Hagan (D-GA)
- Leonard W. Hall (R-NY)
- Charles Halleck (R-IN)
- Seymour Halpern (R-NY)
- Orval Hansen (R-ID)
- Robert P. Hanrahan (R-IL)
- William Henry Harrison III (R-WY)
- R. James Harvey (R-MI)
- Jeffrey P. Hillelson (R-MO)
- Patrick J. Hillings (R-CA)
- Lawrence Hogan (R-MD)
- Joseph F. Holt (R-CA)
- Craig Hosmer (R-CA)
- Robert J. Huber (R-MI)
- William H. Hudnut III (R-IN)
- John E. Hunt (R-NJ)
- Charles R. Jonas (R-NC)
- Walter Judd (R-WA)
- William J. Keating (R-OH)
- Hastings Keith (R-MA)
- Carleton J. King (R-NY)
- Theodore Kupferman (R-NY)
- Dan Kuykendall (R-TN)
- John Henry Kyl (R-IA)
- Melvin Laird (R-WI)
- Odin Langen (R-MN)
- Earl Landgrebe (R-IN)
- Sherman Lloyd (R-UT)
- Clare Boothe Luce (R-CT)
- Buz Lukens (R-OH)
- Clark MacGregor (R-MN)
- William Mailliard (R-CA)
- Joseph J. Maraziti (R-NJ)
- David Martin (R-NE)<f name=ford/>
- James D. Martin (R-AL)
- Bob Mathias (R-CA)
- Wiley Mayne (R-IA)
- William Moore McCulloch (R-OH)
- Jack H. McDonald (R-MI)
- Martin McKneally (R-NY)
- Mike McKevitt (R-CO)
- Robert T. McLoskey (R-IL)
- Walter L. McVey Jr. (R-KS)
- George Meader (R-MI)
- William E. Miller (R-NY)
- William Edwin Minshall Jr. (R-OH)
- Wilmer Mizell (R-NC)
- Arch Moore Jr. (R-WV)
- F. Bradford Morse (R-MA)
- Ancher Nelsen (R-MN)
- Alvin O'Konski (R-WI)
- Stanford Parris (R-VA)
- Dayton E. Phillips (R-TN)
- Alexander Pirnie (R-NY)
- Richard H. Poff (R-VA)
- Howard Pollock (R-AK)
- Walter E. Powell (R-OH)
- Bob Price (R-TX)
- Ben Reifel (R-SD)
- Edwin Reinecke (R-CA)
- Howard W. Robison (R-NY)
- Earl B. Ruth (R-NC)
- Charles Sandman (R-NJ)
- Henry Schadeberg (R-WI)
- William J. Scherle (R-IA)
- Fred Schwengel (R-IA)
- Richard G. Shoup (R-MT)
- Abner Sibal (R-CT)
- H. Allen Smith (R-CA)
- Henry P. Smith III (R-NY)
- Katharine St. George (R-NY)
- Robert H. Steele, (R-CT)
- John H. Terry, (R-NY)
- Fletcher Thompson (R-GA)
- Thor Tollefson (R-WA)
- David Towell (R-NV)
- William M. Tuck (D-VA)
- Stanley Tupper (R-ME)
- James Van Zandt (R-PA)
- Victor Veysey (R-CA)
- John H. Ware (R-PA)
- Prentiss Walker (R-MS)
- Jack Westland (R-WA)
- William B. Widnall (R-NJ)
- John S. Wold (R-WY)
- Wendell Wyatt (R-OR)
- Samuel H. Young (R-IL)
- Roger H. Zion (R-IN)
- John M. Zwach (R-MN)

Governors

- Robert Frederick Bennett (R-KS)
- Kit Bond (R-MO)
- Otis Bowen (R-IN)
- James B. Edwards (R-SC)
- Daniel J. Evans (R-WA)
- Mills Godwin (R-VA)
- James Holshouser (R-NC)
- William Milliken (R-MI)
- Robert D. Ray (R-IA)
- Jim Rhodes (R-OH)

Former Governors

- Sherman Adams (R-NH)
- William T. Cahill (R-NJ)
- Winfield Dunn (R-TN)
- Warren P. Knowles (R-WI)
- Benjamin T. Laney, (D-AR)
- John Davis Lodge (R-CT)
- Thomas Meskill, (R-CT)
- Richard B. Ogilvie (R-IL)
- George W. Romney (R-MI)
- William Scranton, (R-PA)
- John Bell Williams (D-MS)
- Malcolm Wilson (R-NY)

Lieutenant Governors

- John N. Dalton (R-VA)
- James Damman (R-MI)
- Bill Phelps (R-MO)
- Shelby Smith (R-KS)

Attorney Generals

- John Danforth (R-MO)
- Louis J. Lefkowitz (R-NY)
- Robert List (R-NV)
- Evelle J. Younger (R-CA)

Mayors

- Robert Folsom Mayor of Dallas, Texas
- William H. Hudnut III Mayor of Indianapolis, Indiana
- Lawrence Francis Kramer Mayor of Paterson, New Jersey
- Pete Wilson Mayor of San Diego, California

Former Mayor

- Richard Lugar Mayor of Indianapolis, Indiana

Individuals

- Joe Frazier boxer
- Johnny Grant radio personality
- S. I. Hayakawa President of San Francisco State University
- Jack Nicklaus golfer

Baseball

- Andy Etchebarren California Angels catcher
- Bill Freehan Detroit Tigers catcher
- Joe Garagiola former St. Louis Cardinals catcher
- Steve Garvey Los Angeles Dodgers first baseman
- Ken Griffey Sr. Cincinnati Reds outfielder
- Ted Kluszewski Cincinnati Reds coach
- Pete Rose Cincinnati Reds infielder
- Don Sutton Los Angeles Dodgers pitcher

Basketball

- Johnny Orr Michigan Wolverines men's basketball head coach

Football

- Lance Alworth former San Diego Chargers wide receiver
- Bear Bryant Alabama Crimson Tide football head coach
- Woody Hayes Ohio State Buckeyes football head coach
- Ron Kramer former Green Bay Packers end
- Tom Landry Dallas Cowboys head coach

Actors and Actresses

- Fred Astaire
- Chuck Connors
- Bob Dornan
- Glenn Ford
- Zsa Zsa Gabor
- Cary Grant
- Peter Graves
- Jayne Meadows
- Ed Nelson
- Hugh O'Brian
- Dale Robertson
- Wayne Rogers
- Forrest Tucker
- John Wayne

Musicians

- Pearl Bailey singer
- Sonny Bono singer
- Roy Clark guitarist
- Ella Fitzgerald singer
- Lionel Hampton vibraphonist
- Al Hirt trumpeter
- Rod McKuen singer

== Polling ==
In Republican primaries:

=== Before August 1974 ===
Poll source	Publication	Spiro Agnew	Howard Baker	John Connally	Gerald Ford	Barry Goldwater	Charles Percy	Ronald Reagan	Nelson Rockefeller	Other	Undecided/None	
Gallup	March 30 – April 2, 1973	700	35%	1%	15%	–	–	8%	20%	11%	5% (Note: James Buckley with 2%, Edward Brooke and Daniel Evans with 1% each, and Bill Brock with 0%)	6%
Gallup	August 30, 1973	?	22%	11%	10%	–	–	7%	22%	13%	6% (Note: James Buckley with 3%, Edward Brooke with 2%, Daniel Evans with 1%, and Bill Brock with 0%)	9%
Gallup	August 30, 1973	?	–	12%	12%	–	–	8%	32%	16%	9% (Note: James Buckley with 5%, Edward Brooke with 2%, Daniel Evans with 1%, and Bill Brock with 1%)	11%
Gallup	Oct. 6–8, 1973	356	–	3%	16%	–	–	14%	29%	19%	6% (Note: James Buckley with 3%, Edward Brooke with 2%, Bill Brock with 1%, and Daniel Evans with 0%)	8%
Gallup	January 4–7, 1974	377	–	5%	9%	24%	–	8%	20%	18%	8% (Note: Elliot Richardson with 3%, Mark Hatfield and James Buckley with 2% each, and Edward Brooke with 1%)	8%
Gallup	January 4–7, 1974	377	–	7%	11%	–	–	11%	26%	25%	10% (Note: Elliot Richardson with 4%, James Buckley with 3%, Mark Hatfield with 2%, and Edward Brooke with 1%)	10%
Gallup	July 21, 1974	?	–	5%	5%	27%	16%	4%	16%	12%	8% (Note: Elliot Richardson with 3%, James Buckley with 2%, Mark Hatfield with 2%, and Edward Brooke with 1%)	7%

=== August 1974 – December 1975 ===
Poll source	Publication	Howard Baker	John Connally	Gerald Ford	Barry Goldwater	Charles Percy	Ronald Reagan	Nelson Rockefeller	Other	Undecided/None	
Gallup	Feb. 28 – March 3, 1975	330	4%	–	34%	17%	3%	22%	10%	7% (Note: Mark Hatfield with 3%, Elliot Richardson with 3%, and James Buckley with 1%)	3%
Gallup	June 27–30, 1975	375	4%	2%	41%	13%	4%	20%	5%	6% (Note: Elliot Richardson with 3%, Mark Hatfield with 2%, and James L. Buckley with 1%)	5%
Gallup	Aug. 15–18, 1975	348	3%	3%	45%	11%	4%	19%	7%	5% (Note: James L. Buckley with 2%, Mark Hatfield with 2%, and Elliot Richardson with 1%)	3%
Gallup	Oct. 17–20, 1975	339	2%	1%	48%	7%	2%	25%	5%	2% (Note: Elliot Richardson with 3%, James L. Buckley and Mark Hatfield with 1% each)	5%
Gallup	Nov. 21–24, 1975	352	2%	1%	32%	10%	3%	40%	6%	5% (Note: Mark Hatfield with 2%, Elliot Richardson with 2%, and James L. Buckley with 1%)	1%

=== Head-to-head polling ===
Poll source	Publication	Gerald Ford	Ronald Reagan	Undecided/None	
Gallup	June 27–30, 1975	375	61%	33%	6%
Gallup	Dec. 12–15, 1975	?	45%	45%	10%

== Election day ==
Map of the 1976 U.S. presidential election, blue represents Carter winning that state/district, red represents Ford winning that state, light red represents Reagan received a vote.

On November 2, 1976, Ford lost the election to Democratic nominee Jimmy Carter. Carter won 297 electoral votes and 50.1% of the popular vote while Ford only received 240 electoral votes and 48.0% of the popular vote. However, Carter carried 23 states with Washington DC while Ford carried 27 states, this is one of the elections where the presidential candidate defeated the incumbent president in a narrow margin. Reagan got 1 vote from Washington by Mike Padden.

Before the election, both Ford and Carter also debated three times in Philadelphia, San Francisco and Williamsburg from September 23 to October 22, 1976. This is the second debate since 1960, after 16 years.

The vice presidential debate also began at the Alley Theater in Houston, Texas, when Bob Dole faced off against Walter Mondale.

=== Results ===
Electoral results
Presidential candidate	Party	Home state	Popular vote		Electoral vote	Running mate		
Presidential candidate	Party	Home state	Count	Percentage	Electoral vote	Vice-presidential candidate	Home state	Electoral vote
Jimmy Carter	Democratic	Georgia	40,831,881	50.08%	297	Walter Mondale	Minnesota	297
Gerald Ford (incumbent)	Republican	Michigan	39,148,634	48.02%	240	Bob Dole	Kansas	241
Ronald Reagan	Republican	California	— (Note: Mike Padden, a Republican faithless elector from Washington, gave Ronald Reagan one electoral vote.)	—	1	Bob Dole	Kansas	241
Eugene McCarthy	None	Minnesota	744,763	0.91%	0	(Note: The running mate of McCarthy varied from state to state.)		0
Roger MacBride	Libertarian	Virginia	172,557	0.21%	0	David Bergland	California	0
Lester Maddox	American Independent	Georgia	170,373	0.21%	0	William Dyke	Wisconsin	0
Thomas J. Anderson	American	(Note: Research has not yet determined whether Anderson's home state was Tennessee or Texas at the time of the 1976 election.)	158,724	0.19%	0	Rufus Shackelford	Florida	0
Peter Camejo	Socialist Workers	California	90,986	0.11%	0	Willie Mae Reid	Illinois	0
Gus Hall	Communist	New York	58,709	0.07%	0	Jarvis Tyner	New York	0
Margaret Wright	People's	California	49,016	0.06%	0	Benjamin Spock	Connecticut	0
Lyndon LaRouche	U.S. Labor	New York	40,018	0.05%	0	R. Wayne Evans	Michigan	0
Other			75,119	0.09%	—	Other		—
Total			81,540,780	100%	538			538
Needed to win					270			270

Sources: Leip, David. "1976 Presidential Election Results". Dave Leip's Atlas of U.S. Presidential Elections. (popular votes)

"Electoral College Box Scores 1789–1996". National Archives and Records Administration. (Electoral votes)

== Aftermath ==
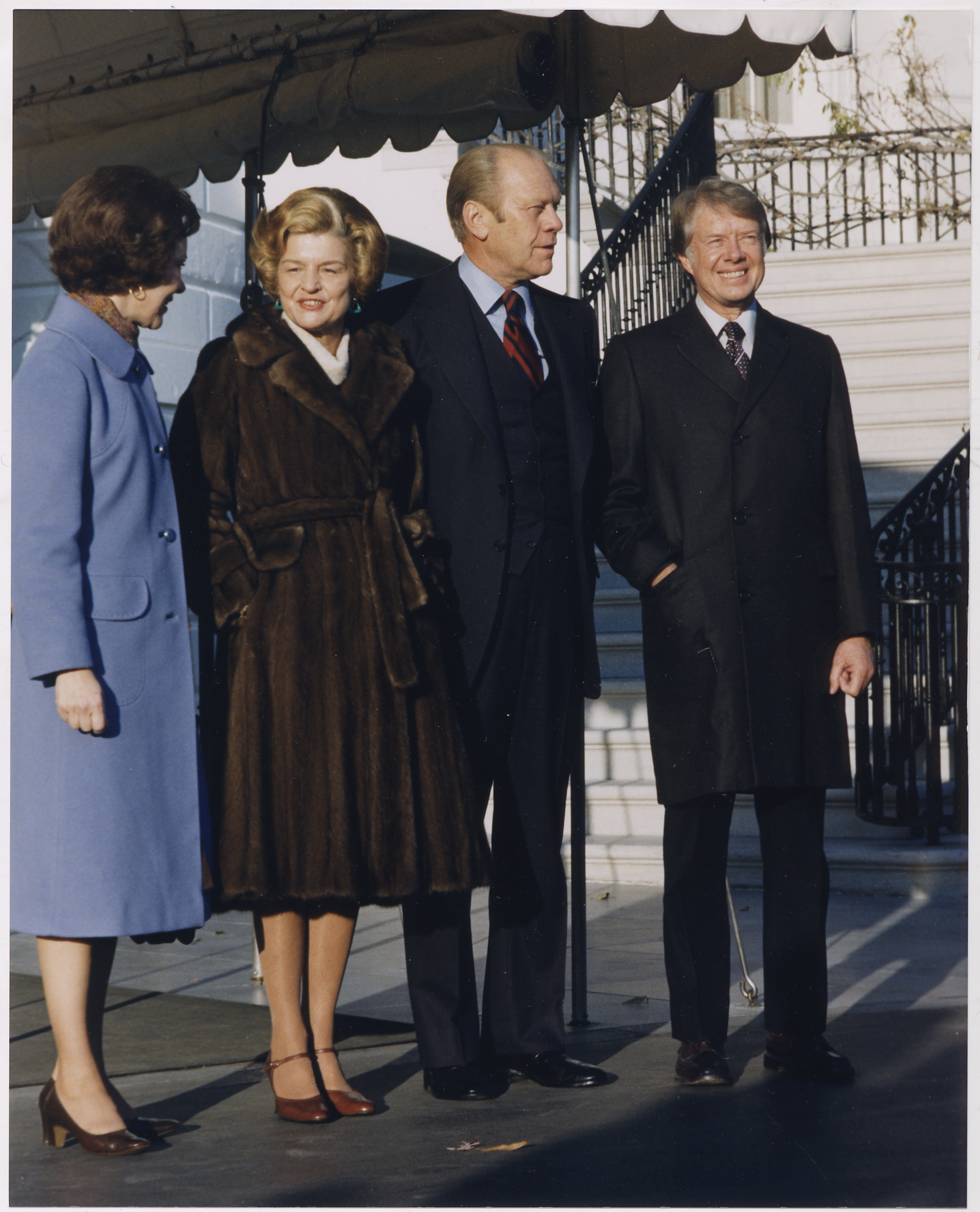
Outgoing President Ford and First Lady Betty Ford meets with President-elect Jimmy Carter and Rosalynn Carter.

Carter became president on January 20, 1977, and served one term in office until January 20, 1981, after Reagan defeated Carter in the 1980 U.S. presidential election.

Bob Dole ran for president as the Republican nominee in the 1996 presidential election but lost to incumbent president Bill Clinton.

This was the only modern presidential election in which both presidential candidates and both vice presidential candidates were still alive 30 years after the election, until Ford's death in 2006. And three of the four were still alive after 44 years, until Walter Mondale's death in April 2021. After Dole's death in December 2021, Carter was the only candidate still alive until his death in December 2024.

Ford and Carter both lived post-presidency for more than 25 years. When Ford died in 2006 due to his worsening arteriosclerotic cerebrovascular disease and diffuse arteriosclerosis, Carter attended his funeral.

== See also ==
- Bibliography of Gerald Ford
- 1976 Republican Party presidential primaries
- 1976 Republican Party vice presidential candidate selection
- 1976 Republican National Convention
- 1976 United States presidential election
- Jimmy Carter 1976 presidential campaign
- Ronald Reagan 1976 presidential campaign
- Presidency of Gerald Ford
