= Jimmy Carter presidential campaign =

Jimmy Carter, the 39th President of the United States, ran for president twice in 1976 and 1980. He was successful in 1976 but lost in 1980:

- Jimmy Carter 1976 presidential campaign, a successful election campaign resulting in him being elected the 39th president of the United States
- Jimmy Carter 1980 presidential campaign, an unsuccessful re-election campaign
