= 1980 New Hampshire Democratic presidential primary =

- February 26, 1980
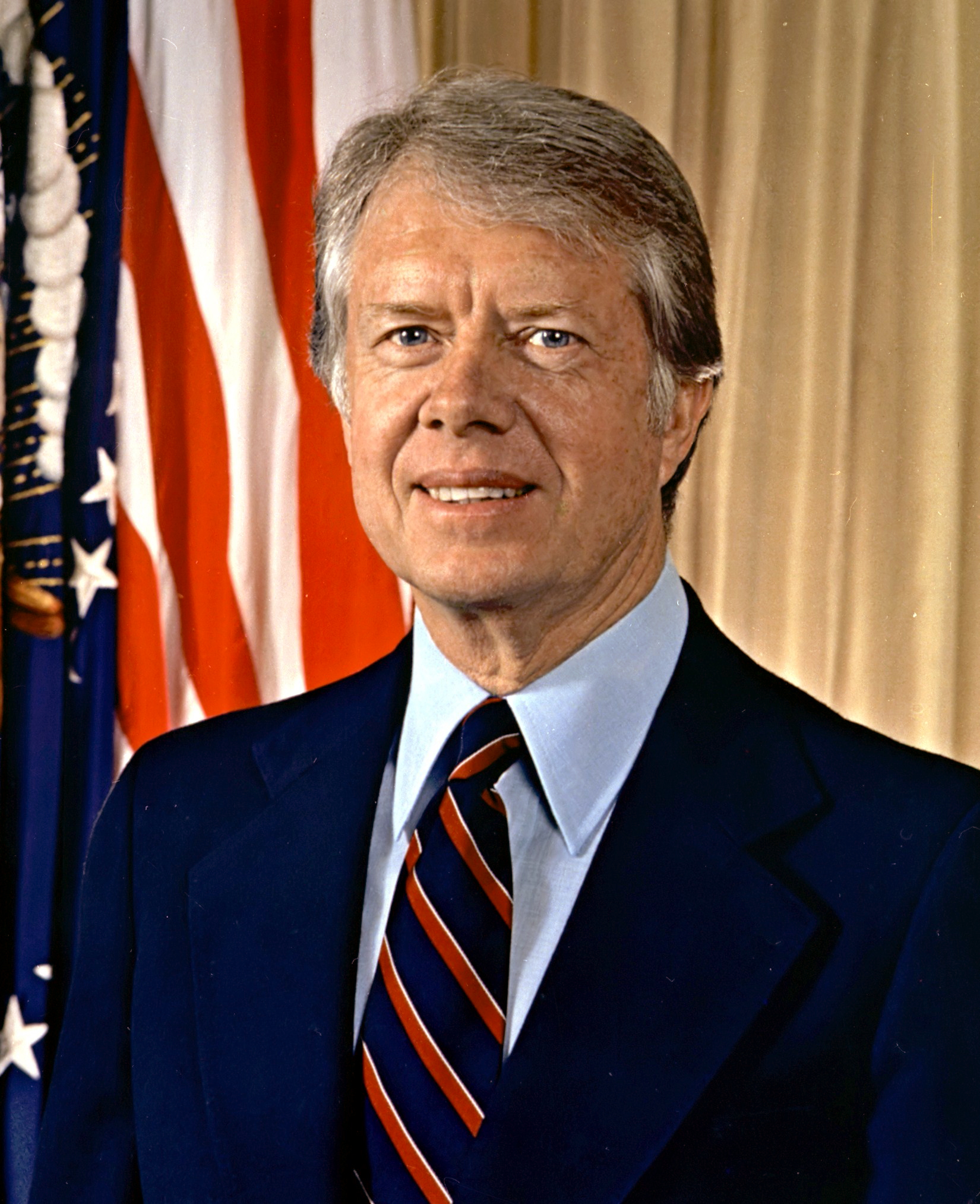

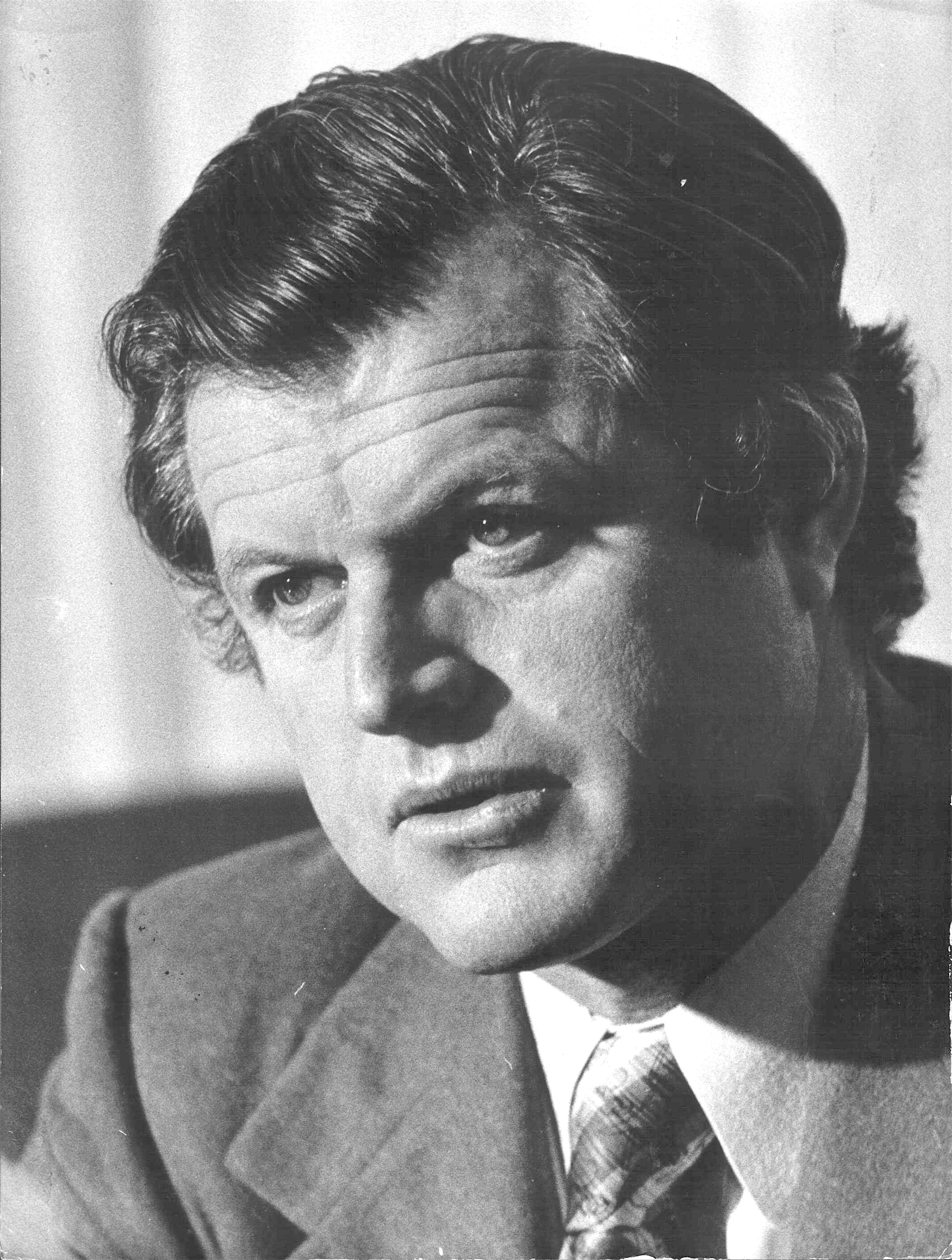

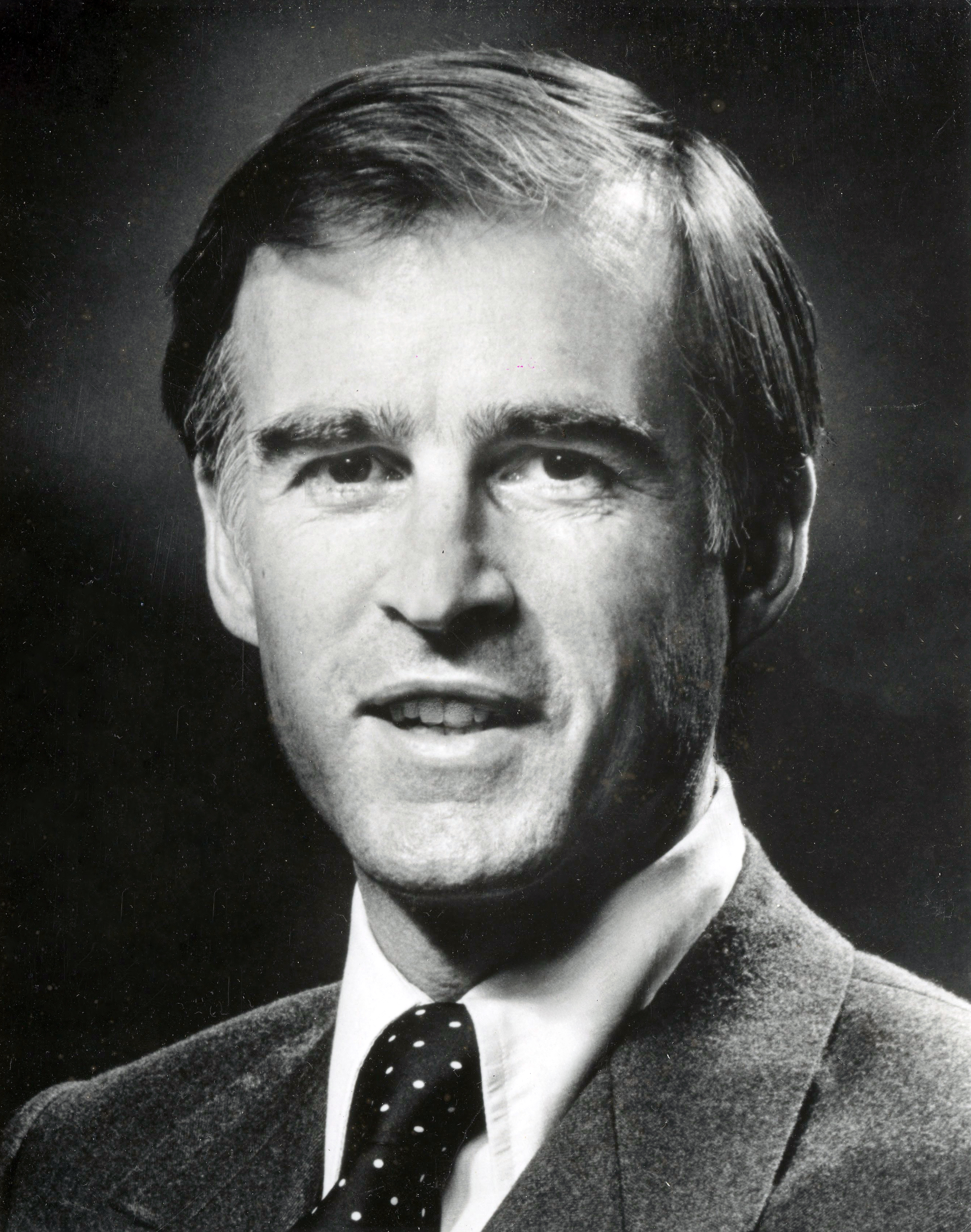
Candidate	Jimmy Carter	Ted Kennedy	Jerry Brown
Home state	Georgia	Massachusetts	California
Delegate count	10	9	0
Popular vote	52,648	41,687	10,706
Percentage	48.8%	38.6%	9.9%
- County results Carter: 40-50% 50-60% Kennedy: 40-50%

The 1980 New Hampshire Democratic presidential primary was held on February 26, 1980, in New Hampshire as one of the Democratic Party's statewide nomination contests ahead of the 1980 United States presidential election.

== Details ==
The New Hampshire primary was the third contest in the nation, held after the Iowa caucuses and the Maine caucuses. The primary was won by incumbent President Jimmy Carter by a relatively narrow margin for an incumbent president. Carter received 49% of the vote and 10 delegates, while his main challenger, Senator Ted Kennedy, received 39% of the vote and 9 delegates. California governor Jerry Brown received just under 10% of the vote, but did not earn a single delegate.

This is the last New Hampshire primary in which an incumbent President running for re-election lost at least one of the Granite State's 10 counties.
