= 1980 Democratic Party presidential primaries =

Selection of the Democratic Party nominee

- January 21 to June 3, 1980

3,346 delegates to the Democratic National Convention 1,674 (majority) votes needed to win

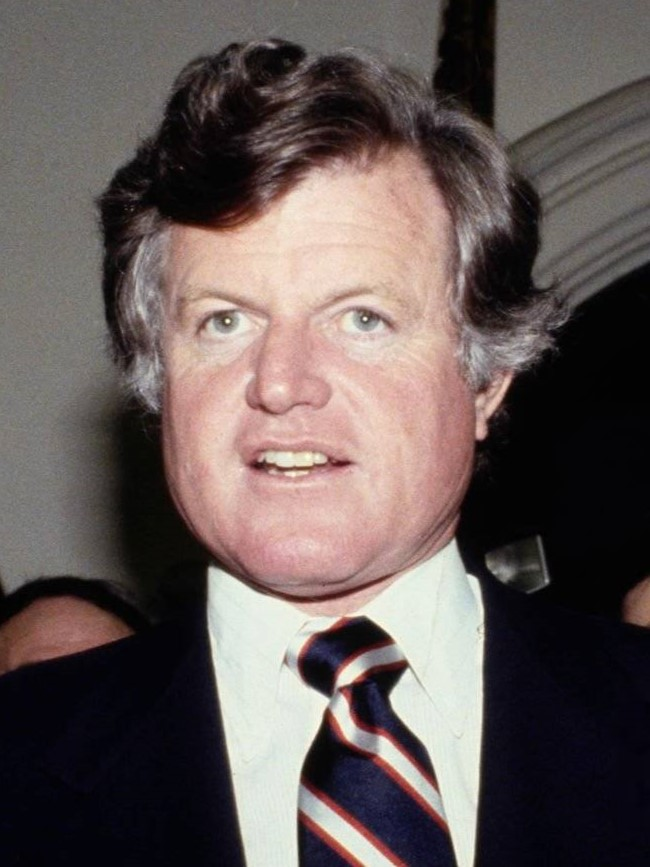

Candidate	Jimmy Carter	Ted Kennedy	Uncommitted
Home state	Georgia	Massachusetts
Delegate count	1,984 (Note: This is an estimate provided by the source.)	1,237	96
Contests won	37	13	1
Popular vote	10,043,016	7,381,693	1,288,423
Percentage	51.1%	37.6%	6.6%
- Carter Kennedy Uncommitted
Previous Democratic nominee
Jimmy Carter
Democratic nominee
Jimmy Carter

From January 21 to June 3, 1980, voters of the Democratic Party chose its nominee for president in the 1980 United States presidential election. Incumbent President Jimmy Carter was again selected as the nominee through a series of primary elections and caucuses, culminating in the 1980 Democratic National Convention, held from August 11 to 14, 1980, in New York City.

Carter faced a major primary challenger in Senator Ted Kennedy of Massachusetts, who won 12 contests and received more than seven million votes nationwide, enough for him to refuse to concede the nomination until the second day of the convention. This remains the last primary election in which an incumbent president's party nomination was still contested going into the convention.

Carter would be the last incumbent president to lose a primary in any contest until Joe Biden lost to Jason Palmer in the 2024 American Samoa Democratic presidential caucuses. For the Democrats in 1980, a then-record of 37 primary races were held.

== Primary race ==
At the time, Iran was experiencing a major uprising that severely damaged its oil infrastructure and greatly weakened its capability to produce oil. In January 1979, shortly after Iran's leader Shah Mohammad Reza Pahlavi fled the country, lead Iranian opposition figure Ayatollah Ruhollah Khomeini returned from a 14-year exile and with the help of the Iranian people toppled the Shah which in turn led to the installation of a new government that was hostile towards the United States. The damage that resulted from Khomeini's rise to power was soon felt throughout many American cities. In the spring and summer of 1979 inflation was on the rise and various parts of the country were experiencing energy shortages. The gas lines last seen just after the Arab/Israeli war of 1973 were back and President Carter was widely blamed.

President Carter's approval ratings were very low—28% according to Gallup, with some other polls giving even lower numbers. In July Carter returned from Camp David and announced a reshuffling of his cabinet on national television, giving a speech whose downcast demeanor resulted in it being widely labelled the "malaise speech." While the speech caused a brief upswing in the president's approval rating, the decision to dismiss several cabinet members was widely seen as a rash act of desperation, causing his approval rating to plummet back into the twenties. Some Democrats felt it worth the risk to mount a challenge to Carter in the primaries. Although Hugh Carey and William Proxmire decided not to run, Senator Edward M. Kennedy finally made his long-expected run at the presidency.

Ted Kennedy had been asked to take his brother Robert's place at the 1968 Democratic National Convention and had refused. He ran for Senate Majority Whip in 1969, with many thinking that he was going to use this as a platform for the 1972 race. However, then came the notorious Chappaquiddick incident that killed Kennedy's car passenger Mary Jo Kopechne. Kennedy subsequently refused to run for president in 1972 and 1976. Many of his supporters suspected that Chappaquiddick had destroyed any ability he had to win on a national level. Despite this, in the summer of 1979, Kennedy consulted with his extended family, and that fall, he let it leak out that because of Carter's failings, 1980 might indeed be the year he would try for the nomination. Gallup had him beating the president by over two to one, but Carter remained confident, famously claiming at a June White House gathering of Congressmen that if Kennedy ran against him in the primary, he would "whip his ass."

Kennedy's official announcement was scheduled for early November. A television interview with Roger Mudd of CBS a few days before the announcement went badly, however. Kennedy gave an "incoherent and repetitive" answer to the question of why he was running, and the polls, which showed him leading the President by 58–25 in August now had him ahead 49–39. Meanwhile, U.S. animosity towards the Khomeini régime greatly accelerated after 52 American hostages were taken by a group of Islamist students and militants at the U.S. embassy in Tehran and Carter's approval ratings jumped in the 60-percent range in some polls, due to a "rally ‘round the flag" effect and an appreciation of Carter's calm handling of the crisis. Taking advantage of Kennedy's separation from his then-wife Joan, one notable campaign bumper sticker from the 1980 campaign read "Vote Jimmy Carter, Free Joan Kennedy."

Kennedy was suddenly left far behind. Carter beat Kennedy decisively in Iowa and New Hampshire. Carter decisively defeated Kennedy everywhere except Massachusetts, until impatience began to build with the President's strategy on Iran. When the primaries in New York and Connecticut came around, it was Kennedy who won.

Momentum built for Ted Kennedy after Carter's attempt to rescue the hostages on April 25 ended in disaster and drew further skepticism towards Carter's leadership ability. Nevertheless, Carter was still able to maintain a substantial lead even after Kennedy won the key states of California and New Jersey in June. Despite this, Kennedy refused to drop out, and the 1980 Democratic National Convention was one of the nastiest on record. On the penultimate day, Kennedy conceded the nomination and called for a more liberal party platform in the Dream Shall Never Die speech, considered by many as the best speech of his career, and one of the best political speeches of the 20th Century. On the stage on the final day, Kennedy for the most part ignored Carter.

== Schedule and results ==
Date (daily totals)	Pledged delegates	Contest	Delegates won and popular vote (Note: This should not be taken as a finalized list of results. While a significant amount of research was done, there were a number of Delegates who were not bound by the instruction, or "Pledged" to a candidate, and to simplify the data these delegates were considered "Uncommitted". Some states also held primaries for the delegate positions, and these on occasion were where slates or candidates pledge to a certain candidate might be elected; however, as these elections allowed for a single person to vote for multiple candidates, as many as the number of positions being filled, it is difficult to determine how many people actually voted in these primaries. For this reason, while the results of some are in the table, they are not included in the popular vote summaries at the bottom of the table.)					
Date (daily totals)	Pledged delegates	Contest	Jimmy Carter	Ted Kennedy	Jerry Brown	Lyndon LaRouche	Others	Uncommitted
January 21	3,220 SDEs	Iowa (Note: Three percent of the precincts had not yet reported their results in the source used.) caucuses	1,830 SDEs	968 SDEs	–	–	–	297 SDEs
February 10	2,247 SDs	Maine (Note: 20 communities of 503 had not yet reported their results in the source used.) caucuses (33,326)	1,017 SDs; 14,528 (43.59%)	847 SDs; 13,384 (40.16%)	263 SDs; 4,626 (13.88%)	–	–	52 SDs; 793 (2.38%)
February 26	0 (of 75)	Minnesota (Note: Only 98 of 100 precincts were tallied in the source, and only by percentages.) caucuses	(~73.7%)	(~10.4%)	–	–	–	–
February 26	19	New Hampshire 111,930	10; 52,692 (47.08%)	9; 41,745 (37.30%)	10,743 (9.60%)	2,326 (2.08%)	4,424 (3.95%)	–
March 4	111	Massachusetts 907,323	34; 260,401 (28.70%)	77; 590,393 (65.07%)	31,498 (3.47%)	–	5,368 (0.59%)	19,663 (2.17%)
March 4	0 (of 12)	Vermont 39,703	29,015 (73.08%)	10,135 (25.53%)	358 (0.90%)	6 (0.02%)	189 (0.48%)	–
March 8	3,220 SDs	Iowa county conventions	1,966 SDs	1,116 SDs	–	–	–	121 SDs
March 11 (207)	45	Alabama 237,464	43; 193,734 (81.59%)	2; 31,382 (13.22%)	9,529 (4.01%)	1,149 (0.48%)	–	1,670 (0.70%)
March 11 (207)	2,367 SDs	Alaska (Note: Only 57% of the seats were decided in the source.) caucuses	392 SDs	110 SDs	10 SDs	–	–	847 SDs
March 11 (207)	99	Florida 1,098,003	76; 666,321 (60.69%)	23; 254,727 (23.20%)	53,474 (4.87%)	–	19,160 (1.75%)	1; 104,321 (9.50%)
March 11 (207)	63	Georgia 384,780	62; 338,772 (88.04%)	1; 32,315 (8.40%)	7,255 (1.89%)	–	2,731 (0.71%)	3,707 (Note: Includes 1,378 votes (0.36%) for Cliff Finch, 513 votes (0.13%) for Lyndon LaRouche.) (0.96%)
March 11 (207)	6,097 CDs	Oklahoma (Note: Only 82% of the precincts were called in the source. The number of delegates elected was also unclear.) caucuses	4,638 CDs	593 CDs	19 CDs	–	–	847 CDs
March 15	0 (of 32)	Mississippi (Note: Only 63% of the delegate selections were given in the source, and only by percentages.) caucuses	(~78%)	(~5%)	(~1%)	–	(~1%)	(~16%)
March 15	11,107 CDs	South Carolina (Note: Only 1,079 of 1,629 precincts were called in the source.) caucuses	7,035 CDs	579 CDs	7 CDs	–	–	3,486 CDs
March 16	41	Puerto Rico 870,235	21; 449,681 (51.67%)	20; 418,068 (48.04%)	1,660 (0.19%)	–	826 (0.10%)	–
March 18	179	Illinois (Note: There were two primaries in this state: a non-binding preference primary in which eligible voters cast ballots directly for a candidate and a delegate primary in which delegates to the National Convention were elected.) 1,201,067	165; 780,787 (65.01%)	14; 359,875 (29.96%)	39,168 (3.26%)	19,192 (1.60%)	2,045 (1.77%)	–
March 18	9,811 CDs	Washington caucuses	5,264 CDs	2,491 CDs	63 CDs	–	–	1,993 CDs
March 22	2,999 SDs	Virginia (Note: Only 90% of meetings were accounted for in the source.) caucuses	2,169 SDs	355 SDs	1 SD	–	–	186 SDs
March 24	11,107 CDs	South Carolina (Note: Only 37 of 45 counties were called in the source.) county conventions	(~69%)	(~6%)	–	–	–	(~25%)
March 25 (336)	54	Connecticut 210,275	25; 87,207 (41.47%)	29; 98,662 (46.92%)	5,386 (2.56%)	5,617 (2.67%)	–	13,403 (6.37%)
March 25 (336)	282	New York 989,062	118; 406,305 (41.08%)	164; 582,757 (58.92%)	–	–	–	–
March 29	932 SDs	Oklahoma county conventions	723 SDs	88 SDs	–	–	1 SDs	120 SDs
April 1 (112)	37	Kansas 193,918	23; 109,807 (56.63%)	14; 61,318 (31.62%)	9,434 (4.87%)	–	2,196 (Note: Includes 629 votes (0.32%) for Cliff Finch.) (1.13%)	9,434 (4.87%)
April 1 (112)	75	Wisconsin 629,619	48; 353,662 (56.17%)	26; 189,520 (30.10%)	1; 74,496 (11.83%)	6,896 (1.10%)	2,351 (Note: Includes 1,842 votes (0.29%) for Cliff Finch.) (0.37%)	2,694 (0.43%)
April 5	51	Louisiana 358,741	39; 199,956 (55.74%)	12; 80,797 (22.52%)	16,774 (4.68%)	–	19,600 (Note: Includes 11,153 votes (3.11%) for Cliff Finch.) (5.46%)	41,614 (11.60%)
April 6	22 (of 32)	Mississippi district conventions	22	–	–	–	–	–
April 12 (60)	0 (of 29)	Arizona (Note: 8 polling places out of 84 had not yet reported their results in the source used.) caucuses (19,600)	8,342 (42.56%)	10,241 (52.25%)	95 (0.49%)	–	8 (Note: Includes 5 votes (0.03%) for Cliff Finch.) (0.04%)	914 (4.66%)
April 12 (60)	37	South Carolina (Note: Only 37 of 45 counties were called in the source.) convention	34	1	–	–	–	2
April 12 (60)	23 (of 64)	Virginia (Note: Only five of ten districts held conventions on this date.) district conventions	21	2	–	–	–	–
April 17	380 SDs	Idaho caucuses	185 SDs	111 SDs	–	–	–	84 SDs
April 18	1,310 SDs	Washington county conventions	744 SDs	368 SDs	–	–	–	198 SDs
April 19 (108)	34 (of 60)	Iowa district conventions	21	11	–	–	–	2
April 19 (108)	18 (of 75)	Minnesota (Note: Only three of eight districts held conventions on this date.) district conventions	12	1	–	–	–	5
April 19 (108)	10 (of 32)	Mississippi district conventions	10	–	–	–	–	–
April 19 (108)	29 (of 42) 932 SDs	Oklahoma district conventions	24	3	–	–	–	2
April 19 (108)	17 (of 64)	Virginia (Note: Only four of ten districts held conventions on this date.) district conventions	14	3	–	–	–	–
April 22	793 SDs	Missouri caucuses	550 SDs	108 SDs	–	–	–	135 SDs
April 22	185	Pennsylvania 1,613,223	91; 732,332 (45.40%)	94; 736,854 (45.68%)	37,669 (2.34%)	–	12,503 (0.78%)	93,865 (5.82%)
April 22	1,535 SDs (Note: Results only for 1,144 of the 1,535 Delegates were accounted for in the source.)	Vermont caucuses	366 SDs	516 SDs	–	–	–	262 SDs
April 26	141	Michigan caucuses	7,567 (46.68%)	7,793 (48.08%)	–	–	–	850 (5.24%)
May 3 (63)	33 (of 75)	Minnesota (Note: Only five of eight districts held conventions on this date.) district conventions	15	4	–	–	–	14
May 3 (63)	13 (of 42)	Oklahoma convention (932 SDs)	10	–	–	–	–	3
May 3 (63)	0 (of 152)	Texas 1,377,356	770,390 (55.93%)	314,129 (22.81%)	35,585 (2.58%)	–	–	257,252 (18.68%)
May 3 (63)	17 (of 64)	Virginia (Note: Only one of ten districts held conventions on this date.) district conventions	4	–	–	–	–	–
May 5	2,918 SDs	Colorado (Note: With only 65% of precincts tallied, no vote beyond percentages.) caucuses	1,174 SDs	852 SDs	–	–	–	892 SDs
May 6 (223)	19	Washington, D.C. 64,150	8; 23,697 (36.94%)	11; 39,561 (61.67%)	–	892 (1.39%)	–	–
May 6 (223)	80	Indiana 589,441	53; 398,949 (67.68%)	27; 190,492 (32.32%)	–	–	–	–
May 6 (223)	69	North Carolina 737,262	53; 516,778 (70.09%)	13; 130,684 (17.73%)	21,420 (2.91%)	–	–	68,380 (9.28%)
May 6 (223)	55	Tennessee 294,680	44; 221,658 (75.22%)	11; 53,258 (18.07%)	5,612 (1.90%)	925 (0.31%)	1,684 (Note: Includes 1,663 votes (0.56%) for Cliff Finch.) (0.57%)	11,515 (3.91%)
May 10	3,900 SDs (Note: Results only for 2,387 of the 3,900 Delegates were accounted for in the source.)	Texas caucuses	1,431 SDs	644 SDs	–	–	–	312 SDs
May 10	11	Wyoming convention	8	3	–	–	–	–
May 13 (54)	30	Maryland 477,090	32; 226,528 (47.48%)	26; 181,091 (37.96%)	14,313 (3.00%)	4,388 (0.92%)	4,891 (Note: All votes for Cliff Finch.) (1.03%)	1; 45,879 (9.62%)
May 13 (54)	24	Nebraska 153,881	14; 72,120 (46.87%)	10; 57,826 (37.58%)	5,478 (3.56%)	1,169 (0.76%)	1,247 (0.81%)	16,041 (10.42%)
May 17 (53)	11	Alaska convention	0.61	1.83	–	–	–	8.56
May 17 (53)	22	Maine convention	11	11	–	–	–	–
May 17 (53)	20 (of 64)	Virginia convention	20	–	–	–	–	–
May 20	0 (of 141)	Michigan 78,424	–	–	23,043 (29.38%)	8,948 (11.41%)	10,048 (12.81%)	36,385 (46.40%)
May 20	39	Oregon 367,204	26; 208,693 (56.83%)	13; 114,651 (31.22%)	34,409 (9.37%)	–	9,451 (2.57%)	–
May 20	3,760 SDs	Utah caucuses	1,779 SDs	876 SDs	–	–	–	1,105 SDs
May 24 (48)	22	Arizona convention	13	16	–	–	–	–
May 24 (48)	14	Delaware convention	10	4	–	–	–	–
May 24 (48)	12	Vermont convention	5	7	–	–	–	–
May 27 (95)	33	Arkansas 448,290	23; 269,375 (60.09%)	5; 78,542 (17.52%)	–	–	19,469 (Note: All votes for Cliff Finch.) (4.34%)	5; 80,904 (18.05%)
May 27 (95)	0 (of 20)	Idaho 50,482	31,383 (62.17%)	11,087 (21.96%)	2,078 (4.12%)	–	–	5,934 (11.76%)
May 27 (95)	50	Kentucky 240,331	38; 160,819 (66.92%)	12; 55,167 (22.96%)	–	–	5,126 (Note: Includes 2,517 votes (1.05%) for Cliff Finch.) (2.13%)	19,219 (8.00%)
May 27 (95)	12	Nevada 66,948	5; 25,159 (37.58%)	3; 19,296 (28.82%)	–	–	–	4; 22,493 (33.60%)
May 30	19	Hawaii convention	15	4	–	–	–	–
May 31	6 (of 40)	Colorado (Note: Only one of five districts held conventions on this date.) district conventions	3	2	–	–	–	1
June 3 (738)	298	California 3,363,969	137; 1,266,276 (37.64%)	167; 1,507,142 (44.80%)	135,962 (4.04%)	71,779 (2.13%)	51 (0.00%)	382,759 (11.38%)
June 3 (738)	53 (of 77)	Missouri (Note: All ten districts held conventions on this date.) district conventions	40	5	–	–	–	8
June 3 (738)	19	Montana 130,059	10; 66,922 (51.46%)	9; 47,671 (36.65%)	–	–	–	15,466 (11.89%)
June 3 (738)	113	New Jersey 560,908	45; 212,387 (37.87%)	68; 315,109 (56.18%)	–	13,913 (2.48%)	–	19,499 (3.48%)
June 3 (738)	20	New Mexico 159,364	10; 66,621 (41.80%)	10; 73,721 (46.26%)	–	4,798 (3.01%)	4,490 (Note: All votes for Cliff Finch.) (2.82%)	9,734 (6.11%)
June 3 (738)	161	Ohio 1,186,410	84; 605,744 (51.06%)	77; 523,874 (44.16%)	–	35,268 (2.97%)	21,524 (1.81%)	–
June 3 (738)	23	Rhode Island 38,327	6; 9,907 (25.85%)	17; 26,179 (68.30%)	310 (0.81%)	1,160 (3.03%)	–	771 (2.01%)
June 3 (738)	19	South Dakota 68,763	9; 31,251 (45.45%)	10; 33,418 (48.60%)	–	–	–	4,094 (5.95%)
June 3 (738)	32	West Virginia 317,934	24; 197,687 (62.18%)	8; 120,247 (37.82%)	–	–	–	–
June 7	24 (of 75)	Minnesota convention	12	7	–	–	–	5
June 8	14	North Dakota convention	7	5	–	–	–	2
June 14 (132)	13 (of 40)	Colorado convention	6	4	–	–	–	3
June 14 (132)	21 (of 40)	Colorado (Note: Only four of five districts held conventions on this date.) (Note: This is an assumption; no sources were found for the other District Conventions, but they occurred sometime before or during the State Convention.) district conventions	11	8	–	–	–	2
June 14 (132)	16 (of 60)	Iowa convention	10	6	–	–	–	–
June 14 (132)	24 (of 77)	Missouri convention	17	–	–	–	–	7
June 14 (132)	58	Washington convention	36	21	–	–	–	1
June 21	152	Texas convention	104	38	–	–	–	10
June 28	17	Idaho convention	8	5	–	–	–	4
July 12	20	Utah convention (3,760 SDs)	10	4	–	–	–	6
3,346 delegates 19,649,458 votes			1,979.61 10,043,016 (51.11%)	1,229.83 7,381,693 (37.57%)	1 575,296 (2.93%)	0 177,784 (0.91%)	0 183,246 (0.93%)	96.56 1,288,423 (6.56%)

== Candidates ==
=== Nominee ===
Candidate	Most recent office	Home state	Campaign Withdrawal date	Popular vote	Contests won	Running mate
Jimmy Carter	President of the United States (1977–1981)	Georgia	(Campaign • Positions); Secured nomination: August 11, 1980	10,043,016 (51.13%)	36; IA, ME, NH, VT, AL, FL, GA, PR, IL, KS, WI, LA, TX, IN, NC, TN, NE, MD, OK, AR ID, KY, NV, MT, OH, WV, MO, OR, WA	Walter Mondale

=== Other major candidates ===
These candidates participated in multiple state primaries or were included in multiple major national polls.

Candidate	Most recent office	Home state	Campaign	Popular vote	Contests won
Ted Kennedy	U.S. Senator from Massachusetts (1962–2009)	Massachusetts	(Campaign) Announced campaign: November 7, 1979 Withdrew at convention: August 11, 1980	7,381,693 (37.58%)	12; AZ, MA, CT, NY, PA, ND, DC, CA, NJ, NM, RI, SD, VT, AK, MI
Jerry Brown	Governor of California (1975–1983)	California	(Campaign); Withdrew: April 2, 1980	575,296 (2.93%)	None

=== Minor candidates ===
Lyndon LaRouche	Cliff Finch	David Duke
Leader of the National Caucus of Labor Committees (1968–2019)	Governor of Mississippi (1976–1980)	Grand Wizard of the Knights of the Ku Klux Klan
177,784 votes	48,032 votes	[data missing]

Far-right politician David Duke tried to run for the Democratic presidential nomination. Despite being six years too young to be qualified to run for president, Duke attempted to place his name onto the ballot in twelve states stating that he wanted to be a power broker who could "select issues and form a platform representing the majority of this country" at the Democratic National Convention.

Alice Tripp attempted to run in order to garner support for the anti-power line movement. She was unable to gain the required number of delegate signatures and endorsed Ron Dellums and spoke in his support at the national convention. She ultimately received votes from two delegates at the convention.

=== Declined to run ===
- Governor Hugh Carey of New York
- Representative Ron Dellums of California
- Senator William Proxmire of Wisconsin
- Senator Joe Biden of Delaware
- Secretary of State Edmund Muskie of Maine
- Author and activist Michael Harrington of Missouri

== Polling ==
=== National polling ===
Poll source	Publication	Jerry Brown	Jimmy Carter	Ted Kennedy	Other	Undecided
Gallup	April 1978	12%	29%	36%	16%	7%
Gallup	July 1978	11%	20%	44%	16%	9%
Gallup	September 1978	8%	34%	39%	12%	7%
Gallup	November 1978	10%	32%	58%	–	
Gallup	April 1979	9%	31%	58%	2%	
Gallup	June 1979	8%	17%	52%	9%	14%
Gallup	June 1979	9%	22%	54%	6%	9%
Gallup	July 1979	9%	21%	53%	16%	1%
Gallup	November 1979	9%	34%	51%	6%	
Gallup	November 1979	8%	32%	39%	5%	16%
Gallup	December 1979	–	46%	42%	12%	
Gallup	January 1980	–	51%	37%	12%	
Gallup	January 1980	–	63%	24%	13%	
Gallup	February 1980	–	61%	32%	7%	
Gallup	March 1980	–	66%	27%	7%	
Gallup	March 1980	–	60%	28%	12%	
Gallup	March 1980	–	59%	31%	10%	
Gallup	April 1980	–	53%	33%	14%	
Gallup	May 1980	–	51%	36%	13%	
Gallup	May 1980	–	58%	31%	11%	
Gallup	July 1980	–	60%	34%	6%	
Gallup	August 1980	–	48%	38%	14%	

== Endorsements ==
Jimmy Carter

U.S. senators

- Senator Joe Biden of Delaware
- Senator John Glenn of Ohio
- Senator Abraham Ribicoff of Connecticut

Federal officials

- Former United Nations Ambassador Andrew Young

Governors

- Governor Bob Graham of Florida
- Governor Brendan T. Byrne of New Jersey
- Governor Edward J. King of Massachusetts

State officials

- State Representative Mary O. Boyle of Ohio
- Secretary of State Anthony J. Celebrezze, Jr., of Ohio
- Treasurer Gertrude Donahey of Ohio
- State Senate president Oliver Ocasek of Ohio

Municipal officials

- Mayor Dianne Feinstein of San Francisco
- Mayor Maynard Jackson of Atlanta
- Mayor William Donald Schaefer of Baltimore

Individuals

- Singer Johnny Cash
- Singer Tom T. Hall
- Singer Willie Nelson
- Musician Hank Snow
- Glenn Watts, president of the Communications Workers of America

Ted Kennedy

U.S. senators

- Senator Robert Byrd of West Virginia, Senate Majority Leader
- Ambassador at Large and United States Coordinator for Refugee Affairs and former Senator Dick Clark of Iowa
- Former Senator William Hathaway of Maine
- Senator Henry M. "Scoop" Jackson of Washington
- Senator George McGovern of South Dakota, former presidential candidate
- Senator Howard Metzenbaum of Ohio
- Senator Paul Tsongas of Massachusetts
- Senator Harrison A. Williams of New Jersey

House of Representatives

- Representative Eugene Atkinson of Pennsylvania
- Representative Shirley Chisholm of New York
- Representative William R. Cotter of Connecticut
- Representative Chris Dodd of Connecticut
- Representative Walter Fauntroy of the District of Columbia
- Representative Ed Markey of Massachusetts
- Representative Barbara Mikulski of Maryland
- Representative Toby Moffett of Connecticut
- Representative William R. Ratchford of Connecticut
- Representative Paul Simon of Illinois
- Representative Louis Stokes of Ohio
- Representative Mo Udall of Arizona

Cabinet officials

- Roswell Gilpatrick, 10th Deputy Secretary of Defense (1961–1964)
- Stewart Udall, 37th United States Secretary of the Interior (1961–1969)

Governors

- Governor Joseph Brennan of Maine
- Former Governor Rafael Hernandez Colon of Puerto Rico
- Former Governor Michael DiSalle of Ohio
- Former Governor Michael Dukakis of Massachusetts
- Former Governor Patrick Lucey of Wisconsin
- Former Governor Thomas P. Salmon of Vermont

State officials

- State Senator Julian Bond of Georgia
- Bill Christiansen, Former Lieutenant Governor of Montana
- State Representative Frank Giglio of Illinois
- Joan Growe, Secretary of State of Minnesota
- James A. Guest, Secretary of State of Iowa
- Tom Miller, Attorney General of Iowa
- Frank Murray, Secretary of State of Montana
- Thomas P. O'Neill III, 65th lieutenant governor of Massachusetts (1975–1983)

Municipal officials

- Carol Bellamy, president of the New York City Council
- Mayor Jane Byrne of Chicago
- Francis J. Caine, former mayor of Burlington, Vermont
- Alderman Wilson Frost of Chicago's 34th Ward
- Richard Fulton, mayor of Nashville, Tennessee
- Mayor William J. Green III of Philadelphia
- Earle Grueskin, former mayor of Sioux City, Iowa
- City Treasurer Cecil A. Partee of Chicago
- Alderman Eugene Sawyer of Chicago's 6th Ward
- Former Mayor Jerry Springer of Cincinnati
- Alderman Edward Vrdolyak of Chicago's 10th Ward

Party officials

- Cuyahoga County Democratic Party chairman Tim Hagan

Labor unions

- AFL-CIO
- Brotherhood of Railway, Airline, Steamship Clerks, Freight Handlers, Express and Station Employees
- International Association of Machinists and Aerospace Workers
- International Union of Police Associations
- New York State United Teachers
- United Automobile Workers
- United Paperworkers' International Union

Organizations

- Americans for Democratic Action

Individuals

- Actor Warren Beatty
- Douglas A. Fraser, president of the United Auto Workers
- Hotel Employees and Restaurant Employees Union Local 617 president Phil Hare
- Actress Goldie Hawn
- Actor Jack Lemmon
- Author Norman Mailer of New York
- Actor Carroll O'Connor
- J. B. Pritzker, high school student and member of the Pritzker family
- Actress Eva Marie Saint
- Singer Andy Williams
- Actor Martin Sheen
- Actor Emilio Estevez

Jerry Brown

Individuals

- Band Chicago
- Band The Doobie Brothers
- Band Eagles
- Actress Jane Fonda
- Singer Helen Reddy
- Singer Linda Rondstadt
- Singer JD Souther

== Convention ==
Presidential tally

- Jimmy Carter (inc.) – 2,123 (64.04%)
- Ted Kennedy – 1,151 (34.72%)
- William Proxmire – 10 (0.30%)
- Koryne Kaneski Horbal – 5 (0.15%)
- Scott M. Matheson – 5 (0.15%)
- Ron Dellums – 3 (0.09%)
- Robert Byrd – 2 (0.06%)
- John Culver – 2 (0.06%)
- Kent Hance – 2 (0.06%)
- Jennings Randolph – 2 (0.06%)
- Warren Spannaus – 2 (0.06%)
- Alice Tripp – 2 (0.06%)
- Jerry Brown – 1 (0.03%)
- Dale Bumpers – 1 (0.03%)
- Hugh L. Carey – 1 (0.03%)
- Walter Mondale – 1 (0.03%)
- Edmund Muskie – 1 (0.03%)
- Thomas J. Steed – 1 (0.03%)

In the vice-presidential roll call, Mondale was re-nominated with 2,428.7 votes to 723.3 not voting and 179 scattering.

== Results ==
County results: (Note: Only partial county returns were available for Arizona and Washington. Additionally, states where no county data was available are shaded according to the statewide winners share of the vote or by the percentage of delegate allocation. Only township level data was available for Connecticut.) Carter: 30–40%; 40–50%; 50–60%; 60–70%; 70–80%; 80–90%; 90–100%; Kennedy: 30–40%; 40–50%; 50–60%; 60–70%; 70–80%; 80–90%; 90–100%; Uncommitted: 30–40%; 40–50%; 50–60%; 60–70%; 70–80%; 80–90%; 90–100%; Brown: 30–40%; 40–50%; Others: 30–40%; 40–50%; Tie: 30–40%; 40–50%; 50–60%; No data

== See also ==
- 1980 Republican Party presidential primaries
- Jimmy Carter rabbit incident
- 2016 Democratic Party presidential primaries
