= 1980 Massachusetts Democratic presidential primary =

- March 4, 1980

112 pledged delegates to the 1980 Democratic National Convention
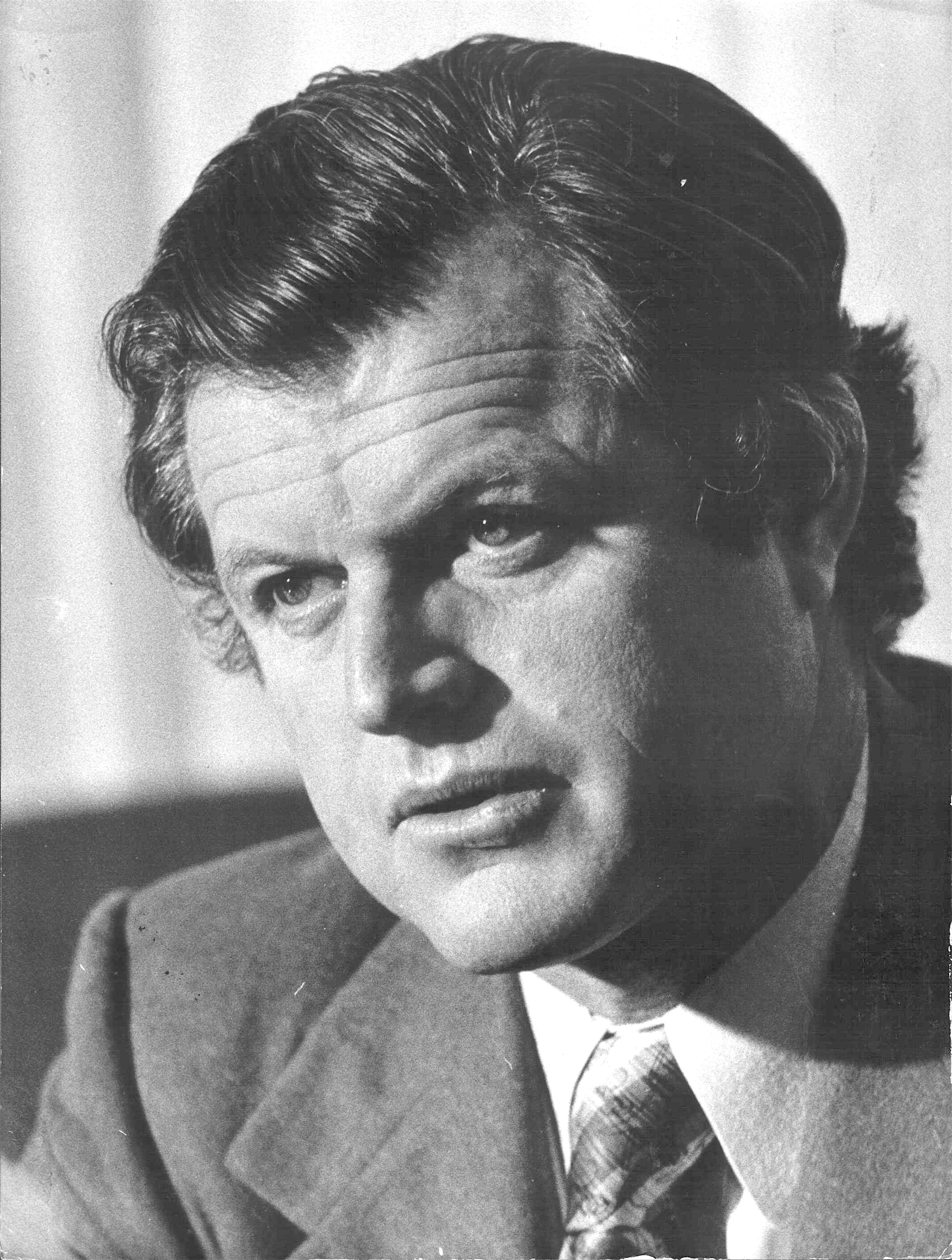

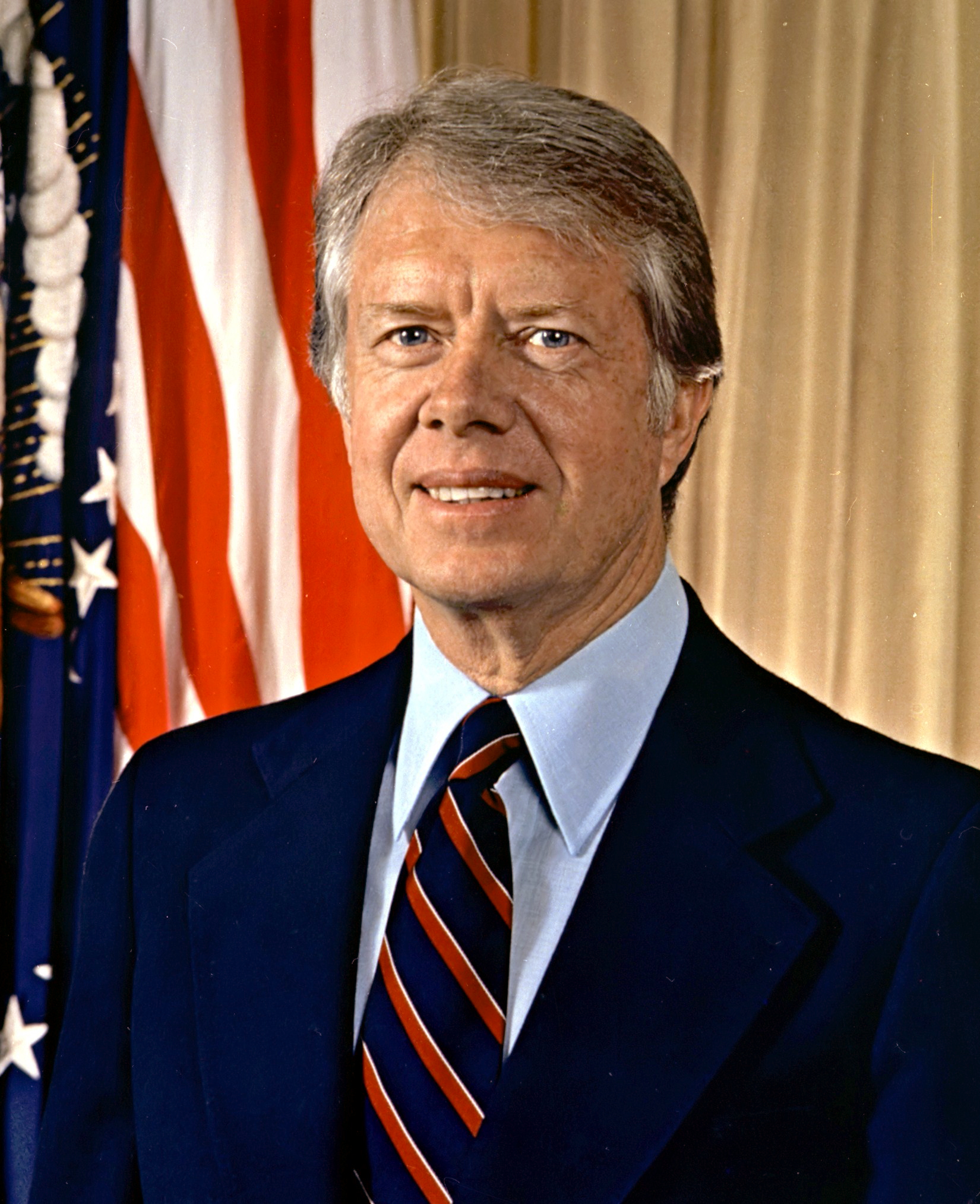
Candidate	Ted Kennedy	Jimmy Carter
Home state	Massachusetts	Georgia
Delegate count	78	34
Popular vote	590,404	260,391
Percentage	65.07%	28.70%

Kennedy
40–50%
50–60%
60–70%
70–80%
80–90%
Carter
30–40%
40–50%
50–60%
60–70%
70–80%
Tie
40–50%

The 1980 Massachusetts Democratic presidential primary was held on March 4, 1980. As part of the 1980 Democratic Party presidential primaries for the 1980 United States presidential election, this was the fourth primary since Iowa, Maine and New Hampshire. 112 pledged delegates to the 1980 Democratic National Convention were allocated to presidential candidates. U.S. Senator Ted Kennedy defeated incumbent President Jimmy Carter surprised by 78 pledged delegates and 590,404 popular votes. Kennedy defeated Carter in his home state.

This marked an incumbent President lost to a primary since the 1964 Democratic Party presidential primaries when President Lyndon Johnson lost to George Wallace in Washington D.C by unpleged delegates. Jimmy Carter perhaps became the last President who lost a primary while during incumbent until incumbent President Joe Biden lost to Jason Palmer in the 2024 American Samoa Democratic presidential caucus.

== Results ==
U.S. Senator Ted Kennedy, the younger brother of former President John F. Kennedy and also the father of U.S. Representative Patrick J. Kennedy, defeated incumbent President Jimmy Carter by 78 pledged delegates from Massachusetts with 590,404 popular votes (65.07%) while Carter received 34 pledged delegates and 260,391 popular votes (28.70%), another candidate, Jerry Brown, Governor of California, received 31,488 popular votes (3.47%), marking first Ted Kennedy's primary win.

Massachusetts Democratic primary, March 4, 1980
Candidate	Votes	Percentage	Actual delegate count		
Candidate	Votes	Percentage	Pledged	Unpledged	Total
Ted Kennedy	590,404	65.07%	78		78
Jimmy Carter (incumbent)	260,391	28.70%	34		34
Jerry Brown	31,488	3.47%			
Other	25,031	2.76%			
Total:	907,314	100%	112		112

== See also ==
- 1980 Democratic Party presidential primaries
- 1980 Republican Party presidential primaries
- 1980 Democratic National Convention
- 1980 Republican National Convention
