= 1980 Iowa Democratic presidential caucuses =

- January 21–June 14, 1980

60 delegates to the Democratic National Convention
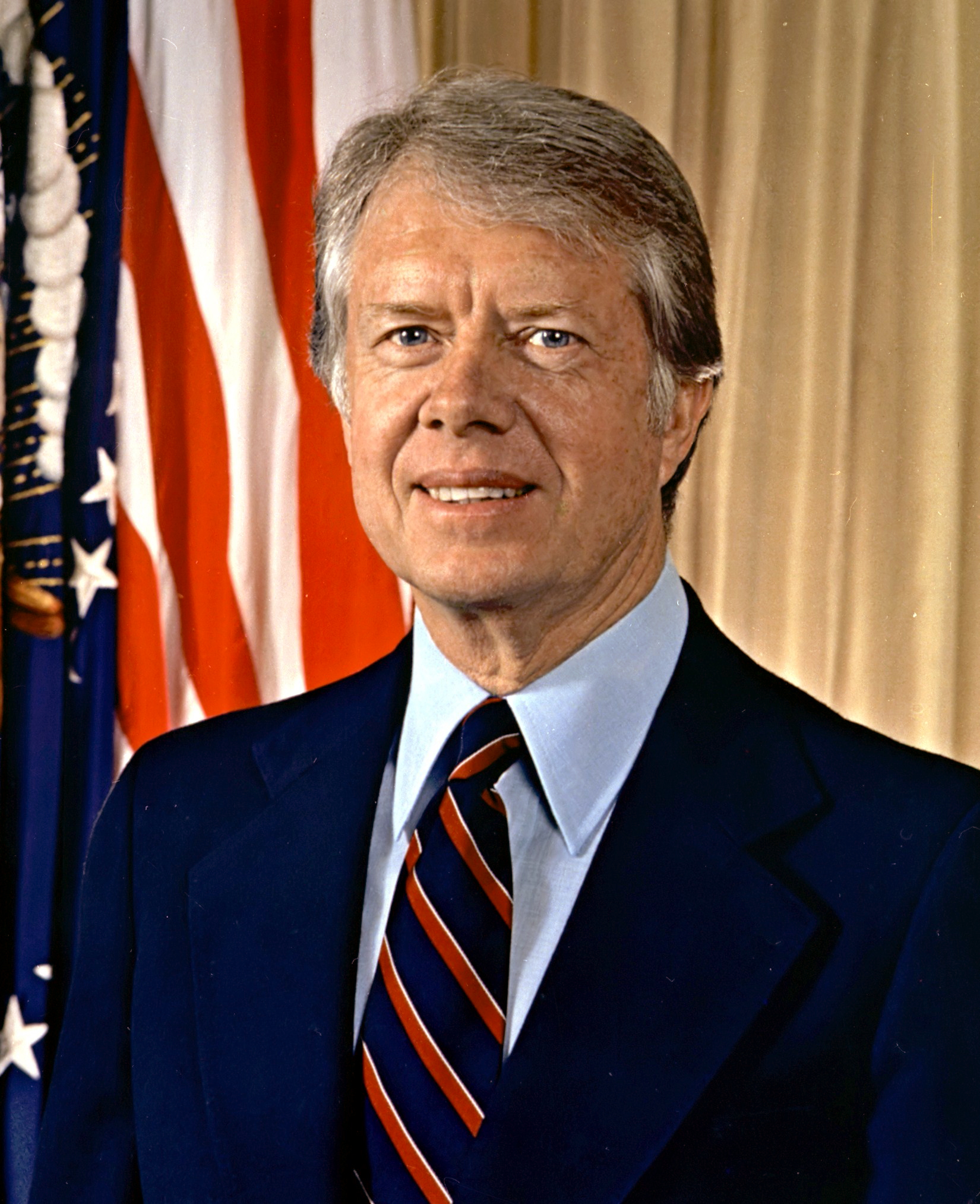

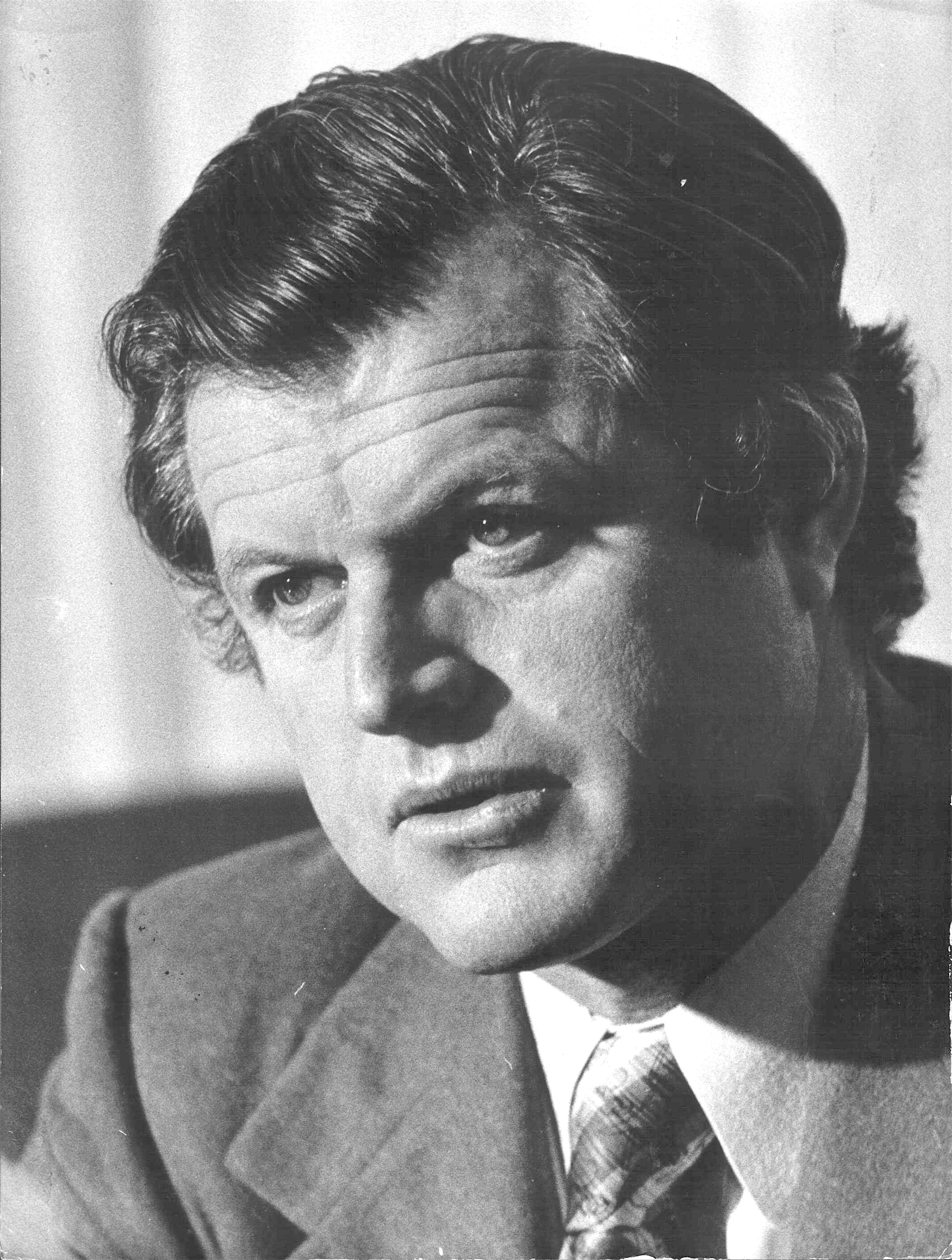

Candidate	Jimmy Carter	Ted Kennedy	Uncommitted
Home state	Georgia	Massachusetts	—
Delegate count	31	23	2
State delegate estimate	3,796 (56.8%)	2,084 (30.1%)	418 (9.61%)
- Carter: 40–50% 50–60% 60–70% 70–80% 80–90% Uncommitted: 40–50% Tie: 40–50%

The 1980 Iowa Democratic presidential caucuses were held on January 21, 1980, for the purpose of electing delegates to the 1980 Democratic National Convention and selecting a candidate for president in the 1980 election. Although the January 21 precinct caucuses did not directly elect any delegates to the national convention, they were the first test of strength in the 1980 Democratic presidential primaries. President Jimmy Carter won the caucuses against U.S. senator Ted Kennedy, securing roughly 57 percent of the delegates elected to county conventions later in the year.

Carter ultimately received 31 of the 60 pledged delegates from Iowa.

== Background ==
In 1976, a strong showing in the Iowa precinct caucuses by former Georgia governor Jimmy Carter raised his profile from obscurity into contention for the Democratic nomination; after winning a series of primaries in other states, he was nominated at the 1976 Democratic National Convention and defeated incumbent president Gerald Ford in the fall election.

=== Procedure ===
The Iowa precinct caucuses were held on January 21, in order to elect delegates to the county conventions. The March 8 county conventions elected delegates to state and congressional district conventions. On April 19, the district conventions met to elect 34 of the state's 60 delegates to the 1980 Democratic National Convention. On June 14, the state convention met to elect the remaining 16 national convention delegates.

Although the precinct caucuses did not directly elect any delegates, they were the first test of strength in the 1980 Democratic presidential primaries.

== Results ==
Incumbent President Jimmy Carter won by 31 delegates while U.S. Senator Ted Kennedy received 23 delegates. Uncommitted delegates won 418 and ultimately, 2 national convention delegates.

Iowa Democratic caucus, January 21, 1980
Candidate	Votes	Percentage	Actual delegate count		
Candidate	Votes	Percentage	Bound	Unbound	Total
Jimmy Carter	3,796	59.16%	31		31
Ted Kennedy	2,084	31.23%	23		23
Uncommitted	418	9.61%	2		2
Total	6,298	100.0%	56		56

District	Carter	Kennedy	Uncommitted
1	62.4%	30.0%	7.5%
2	55.4%	35.3%	9.2%
3	58.7%	31.2%	10.1%
4	55.7%	36.0%	8.3%
5	61.2%	28.3%	10.4%
6	62.2%	25.5%	12.3%

== See also ==
- 1980 Democratic Party presidential primaries
- 1980 Republican Party presidential primaries
- 1980 United States presidential election
- 1980 Democratic National Convention
- 1980 Republican National Convention
