= Cameron M. Alexander =

American Baptist minister

Cameron M. Alexander (February 12, 1932 – December 30, 2018) was an American Baptist minister. He was the leader of the 12,000-member Antioch Baptist Church North and community leader in the English Avenue neighborhood (also known as part of "The Bluff") in Atlanta.

In October 2010, Kennedy Street in English Avenue was renamed Cameron M. Alexander Blvd. in his honor.

Rev. Alexander died on December 30, 2018, at age 86.
