= Antioch Baptist Church North =

Coordinates: 33°46′4.35″N 84°24′19.83″W

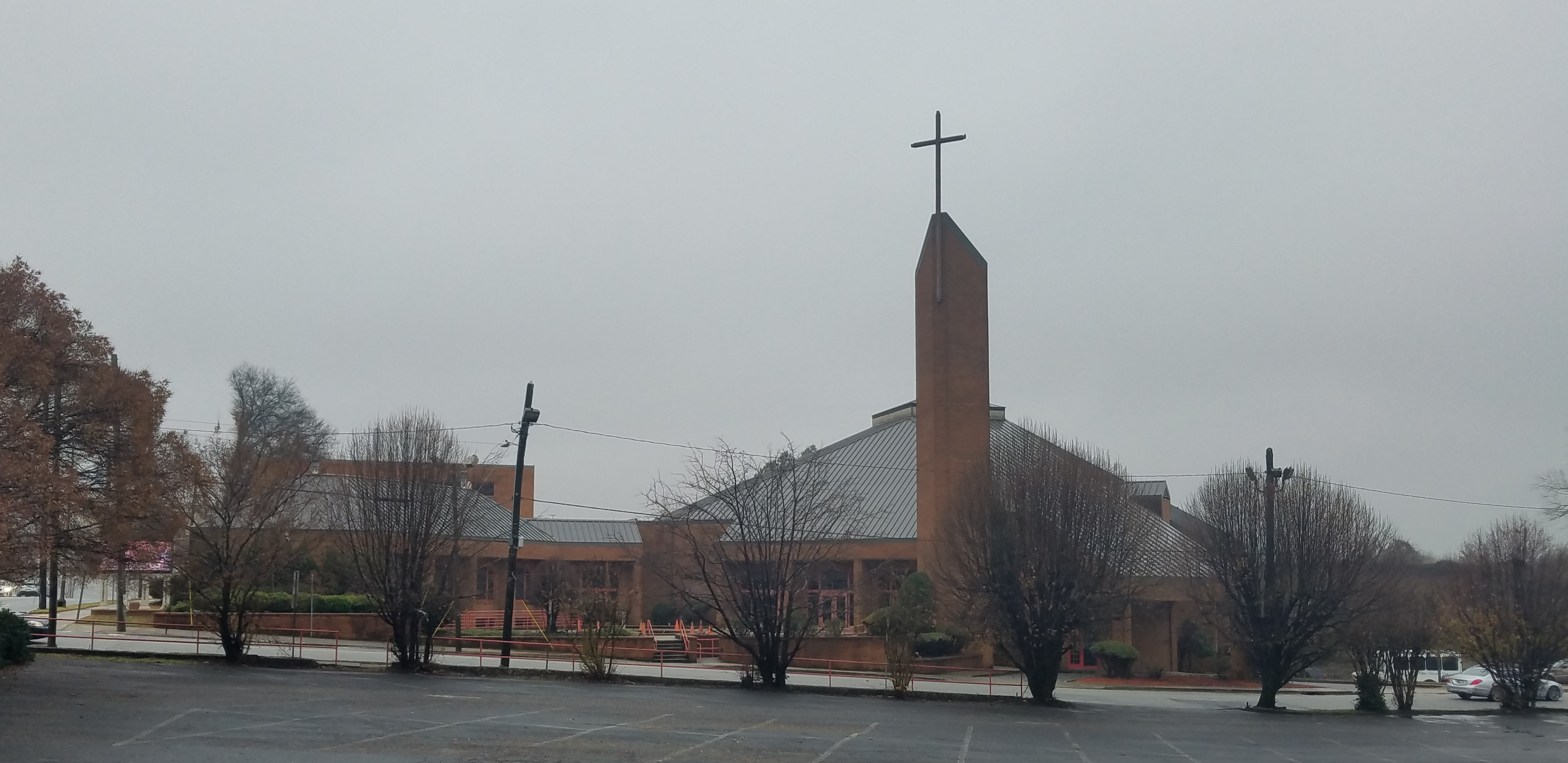
- Antioch Baptist Church North in 2019

- Location within Atlanta Location within Georgia Location within the United States
- Location: 540 Cameron M. Alexander Boulevard (Kennedy Street) N.W. Atlanta, Georgia
- Country: United States
- Denomination: Baptist
- Website: AntiochNorth.org

History
- Founded: 1877
- Founder(s): Oscar Young, Miles Crawford, Jordan Beavers, Lem Wright (et al)

Clergy
- Pastor: C. M. Alexander

Antioch Baptist Church North is a Baptist megachurch in Atlanta, Georgia. It is affiliated with the National Baptist Convention, USA.

== History ==
The Antioch Baptist Church North was founded in 1877 in Atlanta, Georgia by Oscar Young, Miles Crawford, Jordan Beavers and Lem Wright. In 1969, Cameron M. Alexander became the senior pastor until 2018. In 2019, Kenneth Alexander became the new pastor.

== Notable members ==
- Herman Cain
