= 2024 American Samoa Democratic presidential caucus =

- March 5, 2024

11 delegates (6 pledged, 5 unpledged) to the Democratic National Convention
- Turnout: 0.6% (registered voters) ▼1.6 pp
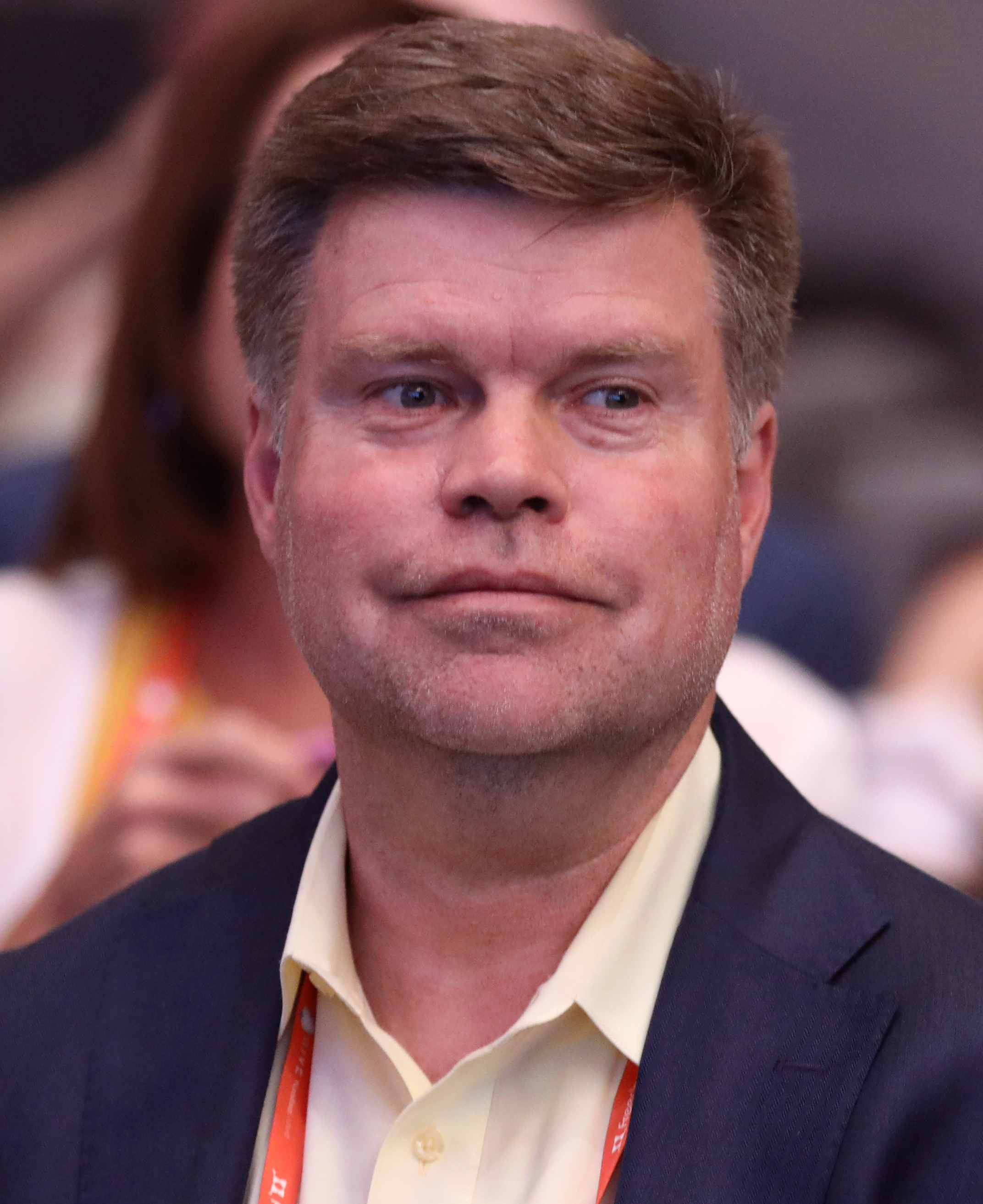

Candidate	Jason Palmer	Joe Biden
Home state	Maryland	Delaware
Delegate count	3	3
Popular vote	51	40
Percentage	56.0%	44.0%

The 2024 American Samoa Democratic presidential caucus was held on March 5, 2024, as part of the Democratic Party primaries for the 2024 presidential election. Six delegates to the 2024 Democratic National Convention were allocated, with five additional unpledged delegates. The contest was held as an open caucus on Super Tuesday alongside primaries in 14 other states and territories. The Republican caucus was held three days later.

Biden unexpectedly lost the popular vote to lesser-known candidate Jason Palmer, making Biden the first incumbent president to lose a contested presidential primary since Jimmy Carter lost 13 primaries to Ted Kennedy in 1980. Palmer had three campaign staffers on the island and held several virtual events prior to the caucuses. A Biden campaign official dismissed the loss as "silly news." It was initially reported by the American Samoa Democratic Party that Palmer won four delegates, while Joe Biden won two. The same day, the delegate count was corrected, with Palmer and Biden winning three delegates each.

Biden's loss in American Samoa makes it the only state or territory primary he never won in all four of his presidential bids.

== Results ==
2024 American Samoa Democratic pres. caucus
Candidate	Votes	%	Delegates
Jason Palmer	51	56.04	3
Joe Biden (incumbent)	40	43.96	3
Dean Phillips	0	0.00	0
Total	91	100%	6

== See also ==
- 2024 American Samoa Republican presidential caucuses
- 2024 Democratic Party presidential primaries
- 2024 United States presidential election
- 2024 United States elections
