= List of superdelegates at the 2016 Democratic National Convention =

This list tracks the support for given candidates among the 716 unpledged delegates (commonly known as superdelegates) who were eligible to cast a vote at the 2016 Democratic National Convention, held July 25–28, 2016, in Philadelphia. The 8 unpledged delegates from Democrats Abroad carry half-votes at the convention, yielding a total of 712 votes. Unpledged delegates represent about 15% of the overall convention votes (4,767 delegates, 4,763 votes) and come from several categories of prominent Democratic Party members:

- 437 elected members (with 433 votes) from the Democratic National Committee (including the chairs and vice-chairs of each state's Democratic Party)
- 20 distinguished party leaders (DPL), consisting of current and former presidents, current and former vice-presidents, former congressional leaders, and former DNC chairs
- 191 Democratic members of the United States House of Representatives (including non-voting delegates from DC and territories)
- 47 Democratic members of the United States Senate (including Washington, DC shadow senators)
- 21 Democratic governors (including territorial governors and the Mayor of the District of Columbia).

Superdelegates are "unpledged" in the sense that they themselves decide which candidate to support. (In other words, they are not allocated according to voter preferences as the majority of delegates are.) Pledged delegates can change their vote if no candidate is elected on the first ballot and can even vote for a different candidate on the first ballot if they are "released" by the candidate they are pledged to. Superdelegates, on the other hand, can change their vote purely of their own volition. With the exception of the eight DNC members from the Democrats Abroad, who each receive a half-vote, all superdelegates are entitled to one vote (including when a sitting official or distinguished party leader is also a DNC member). Throughout this list, those who qualify under multiple categories are considered as sitting officials first, then as DNC members, and then as DPLs (for example, a sitting senator who is also a DNC member is listed as a senator).

The list below is based on the most recent information on how unpledged delegates voted at the roll call vote at the Democratic National Convention in July 2016.

== Totals by group ==
	Distinguished party leaders	Governors	Senators	Representatives	DNC members	Totals
Hillary Clinton	17	20	45	177	313½	572½
Bernie Sanders	1	0	2	7	32½	42½
Martin O'Malley	0	0	0	0	1	1
No endorsement	2	1	0	7	86	96
Totals	20	21	47	191	433	712

Note: Democrats Abroad Superdelegates are assigned half-votes; each of them accounts for ½ rather than 1 in the table above.

== List ==
Delegate	State	Position	Endorsement
Alma Adams	NC	Rep.	Clinton
Pete Aguilar	CA	Rep.	Clinton
Steven K. Alari	CA	DNC	None
Maggie Allen	ME	DNC	Clinton
Jill Alper	MI	DNC	Clinton
Rafael Anchia	TX	DNC	Clinton
Joe Andrew	MD	DPL	None
Stuart Appelbaum	NY	DNC	Clinton
Dennis Archer	MI	DNC	Clinton
Patrice M. Arent	UT	DNC	Clinton
Brad Ashford	NE	Rep.	Clinton
Jon M. Ausman	FL	DNC	Clinton
Carrie Austin	IL	DNC	Clinton
Shawn K. Bagley	CA	DNC	Clinton
Tammy Baldwin	WI	Sen.	Clinton (Note: Pelosi Club: this superdelegate is committed to voting for the eventual leader in pledged delegates)
Nick Balletto	CT	DNC	Clinton
Virginia Barnes	MA	DNC	None
Phil Bartlett	ME	DNC	Clinton
Karen Bass	CA	Rep.	Clinton
Jan Bauer	IA	DNC	Clinton
Joyce Beatty	OH	Rep.	Clinton
Xavier Becerra	CA	Rep.	Clinton
Van Beechler	ID	DNC	None
Cecil Benjamin	VI	DNC	Clinton
Michael Bennet	CO	Sen.	Clinton
Ami Bera	CA	Rep.	Clinton
Bret Berlin	FL	DNC	Clinton
Jeff Berman	DC	DNC	Clinton
Don Beyer	VA	Rep.	Clinton
Belinda Biafore	WV	DNC	Clinton
Gus Bickford	MA	DNC	Clinton
Joe Biden	DE	DPL	Clinton
Erin Bilbray	NV	DNC	Sanders
Rachel Binah	CA	DNC	None
Sanford Bishop	GA	Rep.	None
Stephen Bittel	FL	DNC	Clinton
Neville Blakemore	KY	DNC	None
Artie Blanco	NV	DNC	Clinton
Richard Bloomingdale	PA	DNC	Clinton
Earl Blumenauer	OR	Rep.	Clinton
Richard Blumenthal	CT	Sen.	Clinton
Dean Boerste	IN	DNC	Clinton
James C. Boland	DC	DNC	Clinton
Suzanne Bonamici	OR	Rep.	Clinton
Anita Bonds	DC	DNC	Clinton
Cory Booker	NJ	Sen.	Clinton
Madeleine Bordallo	GU	Rep.	Clinton
David Bowen	WI	DNC	Sanders
Muriel Bowser	DC	Gov.	Clinton
Barbara Boxer	CA	Sen.	Clinton
Carolyn Boyce	ID	DNC	Clinton
Rick Boylan	FL	DNC	None
Brendan F. Boyle	PA	Rep.	Clinton
Bob Brady	PA	Rep.	Clinton
Bob Bragar	DA (Note: Democrats Abroad Superdelegates receive a ½ vote.)	DNC	Clinton
Sandra Brandt	VA	DNC	Clinton
Joyce Brayboy	NC	DNC	None
Donna Brazile	DC	DNC	Clinton
Christine Bremer Muggli	WI	DNC	Clinton
Scott Brennan	IA	DNC	Clinton
Doug Brooks	MO	DNC	Clinton
Boyd Brown	SC	DNC	Clinton
Byron Brown	NY	DNC	Clinton
Corrine Brown	FL	Rep.	Clinton
Jerry Brown	CA	Gov.	Clinton
Kate Brown	OR	Gov.	Clinton
Michael D. Brown	DC	Sen.	Clinton
Sherrod Brown	OH	Sen.	Clinton
Julia Brownley	CA	Rep.	Clinton
Jocelyn Bucaro	OH	DNC	Clinton
Raymond Buckley	NH	DNC	None
Steve Bullock	MT	Gov. (Note: Is also a member of the Democratic National Committee.)	Clinton
Tonio Burgos	NJ	DNC	Clinton
Carol Burke	VI	DNC	None
Cordelia Lewis Burks	IN	DNC	Clinton
John L. Burton	CA	DNC	None
Joe Buscaino	CA	DNC	Clinton
Cheri Bustos	IL	Rep.	Clinton
Laphonza Butler	CA	DNC	Clinton
G. K. Butterfield	NC	Rep.	Clinton
Luisette Cabañas Colón	PR	DNC	Clinton
Michael Cacace	CT	DNC	Clinton
Mitchell Caesar	FL	DNC	Clinton
Mary Beth Cahill	DC	DNC	Clinton
Laura Calvo	OR	DNC	None
Rosiky F. Camacho	MP	DNC	Clinton
MaryEva Candon	DC	DNC	Clinton
Maria Cantwell	WA	Sen.	Clinton
Lois Capps	CA	Rep.	Clinton
Michael Capuano	MA	Rep.	Clinton
Tony Cardenas	CA	Rep.	Clinton
Ben Cardin	MD	Sen.	Clinton
Maria Cardona	DC	DNC	Clinton
John Carney	DE	Rep.	Clinton
Tom Carper	DE	Sen.	Clinton
André Carson	IN	Rep.	Clinton
Jimmy Carter	GA	DPL	Clinton
Karen Carter Peterson	LA	DNC	Clinton
Matt Cartwright	PA	Rep.	Clinton
Barbra Casbar Siperstein	NJ	DNC	Clinton
Bob Casey Jr.	PA	Sen.	Clinton
Richard Cassidy	VT	DNC	Sanders
Kathy Castor	FL	Rep.	Clinton
Joaquín Castro	TX	Rep.	Clinton
Emelia S. Chargualaf	MP	DNC	Clinton
Naeemah Charles	CA	DNC	Clinton
Will Cheek	TN	DNC	Clinton
Michael Childers	WI	DNC	Clinton
Judy Chu	CA	Rep.	Clinton
David Cicilline	RI	Rep.	Clinton
Katherine Clark	MA	Rep.	Clinton
Martha Fuller Clark	NH	DNC	Sanders
Yvette Clarke	NY	Rep.	Clinton
Lacy Clay	MO	Rep.	Clinton
James Clayborne Jr.	IL	DNC	Clinton
Emanuel Cleaver	MO	Rep.	Clinton
Alan Clendenin	FL	DNC	Clinton
Bill Clinton	NY	DPL	Clinton
Jim Clyburn	SC	Rep.	Clinton
Kathleen Clyde	OH	DNC	Clinton
Gilda Cobb-Hunter	SC	DNC	None
Tony Coelho	DE	DNC	Clinton
Larry Cohen	DC	DNC	Sanders
Steve Cohen	TN	Rep.	Clinton
Maria C. Cole	NY	DNC	Clinton
Rickey Cole	MS	DNC	Clinton
Garnet Coleman	TX	DNC	Clinton
Jim Condos	VT	DNC	Sanders
Gerry Connolly	VA	Rep.	Clinton
John Conyers	MI	Rep.	Clinton
Steven Cook	MI	DNC	None
Vivian E. Cook	NY	DNC	None
Chris Coons	DE	Sen.	Clinton
Jim Cooper	TN	Rep.	Clinton
Maria Cordone	MD	DNC	Clinton
Peter Corroon	UT	DNC	Sanders
Jim Costa	CA	Rep.	Clinton
Jerry Costello	IL	DNC	Clinton
Ed Cote	WA	DNC	None
Pat Cotham	NC	DNC	Sanders
Jeannette Council	NC	DNC	Clinton
Joe Courtney	CT	Rep.	Clinton
Janet Cowell	NC	DNC	Clinton
Jeffrey David Cox	NC	DNC	Clinton
Doris Crouse-Mays	VA	DNC	None
Joseph Crowley	NY	Rep.	Clinton
Henry Cuellar	TX	Rep.	Clinton
John Cullerton	IL	DNC	Clinton
Elijah Cummings	MD	Rep.	Clinton
Jennifer Cunningham	NY	DNC	Clinton
Andrew Cuomo	NY	Gov.	Clinton
Ana Cuprill	WY	DNC	Clinton
Melba Curls	MO	DNC	Clinton
John Currie	NJ	DNC	Clinton
Kenneth M. Curtis	FL	DPL	None
Joyce Cusack	FL	DNC	Clinton
Jean Lemire Dahlman	MT	DNC	Sanders
John D. Daniello	DE	DNC	Clinton
Tom Daschle	SD	DPL	Clinton
Clint Daughtrey	AL	DNC	None
Leah Daughtry	NY	DNC	None
Danny K. Davis	IL	Rep.	Clinton
Susan Davis	CA	Rep.	Clinton
Wendy Davis	GA	DNC	Clinton
Yvonne Davis	TX	DNC	None
Ralph Dawson	NY	DNC	Clinton
Mark Dayton	MN	Gov.	Clinton
Howard Dean	VT	DPL	Clinton
Dottie Deans	VT	DNC	Sanders
Peter DeFazio	OR	Rep.	None
Diana DeGette	CO	Rep.	Clinton
John Delaney	MD	Rep.	Clinton
Rosa DeLauro	CT	Rep.	Clinton
Suzan DelBene	WA	Rep.	Clinton
Debra DeLee	MA	DPL	Clinton
Lizette Delgado Polanco	NJ	DNC	Clinton
Mark DeSaulnier	CA	Rep.	Clinton
Ted Deutch	FL	Rep.	Clinton
Barbaralee Diamonstein-Spielvogel	NY	DNC	Clinton
Grace Diaz	RI	DNC	Clinton
Brandon Dillon	MI	DNC	Clinton
Nancy DiNardo	CT	DNC	Clinton
Debbie Dingell	MI	Rep.	Clinton
Arrington Dixon	DC	DNC	Clinton
Frank Dixon	OR	DNC	None
Chris Dodd	CT	DPL	Clinton
Lloyd Doggett	TX	Rep.	Clinton
Kate Donaghue	MA	DNC	Clinton
Ronald Donatucci	PA	DNC	Clinton
Joe Donnelly	IN	Sen.	Clinton
Becca Doten	CA	DNC	Clinton
Joanne Dowdell	NH	DNC	Clinton
Michael F. Doyle	PA	Rep.	Clinton
Tammy Duckworth	IL	Rep.	Clinton
Maria Elena Durazo	CA	DNC	None
Dick Durbin	IL	Sen.	Clinton
Jess Durfee	CA	DNC	Clinton
Mary Ellen Early	CA	DNC	None
John Eastwood	DA	DNC	None
Maria Echaveste	CA	DNC	Clinton
Olma Echeverri	NC	DNC	Clinton
Donna Edwards	MD	Rep.	Clinton
John Bel Edwards	LA	Gov.	Clinton
Joyce Elliott	AR	DNC	Clinton
Keith Ellison	MN	Rep.	Clinton
Louis Elrod	GA	DNC	None
Eliot Engel	NY	Rep.	Clinton
Akilah Ensley	NC	DNC	Clinton
Reni Erdos	NJ	DNC	Sanders
Anna Eshoo	CA	Rep.	Clinton
Lily Eskelsen García	DC	DNC	Clinton
Elizabeth Esty	CT	Rep.	Clinton
Joe Falk	FL	DNC	Clinton
Sam Farr	CA	Rep.	Clinton
Herman Farrell	NY	DNC	Clinton
Dianne Feinstein	CA	Sen.	Clinton
Katherine Fernández Rundle	FL	DNC	Clinton
Raj Fernando	IL	DNC	Clinton
Hector Figueroa	NY	DNC	Clinton
Bill Foster	IL	Rep.	Clinton
Donald Fowler	SC	DNC (Note: Is also a Distinguished Party Leader as a former Chair of the Democratic National Committee.)	Clinton
Earl Fowlkes	DC	DNC	Clinton
Lois Frankel	FL	Rep.	Clinton
Isabel Framer	OH	DNC	Clinton
Pat Frost Brooks	OH	DNC	Clinton
Al Franken	MN	Sen.	Clinton
Jim Frasier	OK	DNC	None
David Frye	IN	DNC	Clinton
Marcia Fudge	OH	Rep.	Clinton
Tulsi Gabbard	HI	Rep.	Sanders
Alexandra Gallardo-Rooker	CA	DNC	None
Kate Gallego	AZ	DNC	Clinton
Ruben Gallego	AZ	Rep.	Clinton
John Garamendi	CA	Rep.	Clinton
Eric Garcetti	CA	DNC	Clinton
Teresa Garcia Krusor	KS	DNC	Clinton
Alejandro García Padilla	PR	Gov.	Clinton
Montserrat Garibay	TX	DNC	Clinton
Al Garrett	MI	DNC	Clinton
Tefere Gebre	MD	DNC	None
Dick Gephardt	MO	DPL	Clinton
Penny Gerber	PA	DNC	Clinton
Alice Germond	CA	DNC	Clinton
Pete Gertonson	ID	DNC	Sanders
Mike Gierau	WY	DNC	Clinton
Kirsten Gillibrand	NY	Sen.	Clinton
Bob Gilligan	DE	DNC	Clinton
Emily Giske	NY	DNC	Clinton
Angel Gomez	FL	DNC	Clinton
Alma Gonzalez	FL	DNC	Clinton
Barry Goodman	MI	DNC	Clinton
Lisa Goodman	DE	DNC	Clinton
Al Gore	TN	DPL	Clinton
Billi Gosh	VT	DNC	Clinton
Gwen Graham	FL	Rep.	Clinton
Anthony Graves	CO	DNC	Clinton
Alan Grayson	FL	Rep.	Sanders
Al Green	TX	Rep.	Clinton
Darlene Green	MO	DNC	Clinton
Gene Green	TX	Rep.	Clinton
Amanda Green-Hawkins	PA	DNC	Clinton
Vallena Greer	MS	DNC	Clinton
Janice Griffin	MD	DNC	None
Raúl Grijalva	AZ	Rep.	Clinton
Marcel Groen	PA	DNC	Clinton
Michael Gronstal	IA	DNC	Clinton
Stanley Grossman	DA	DNC	Clinton
Steve Grossman	MA	DPL	Clinton
Carol Guthrie	TX	DNC	None
Joni Gutierrez	NM	DNC	Clinton
Luis Gutiérrez	IL	Rep.	Clinton
Debra Haaland	NM	DNC	Clinton
Dan Halpern	GA	DNC	Clinton
Janice Hahn	CA	Rep.	Clinton
Mary Hales	WY	DNC	Clinton
Mark Hammons	OK	DNC	None
Emmett Hansen II	VI	DNC	Clinton
Elaine Harris	WV	DNC	Clinton
Fred R. Harris	NM	DPL	Clinton
Jaime Harrison	SC	DNC	Clinton
Maggie Hassan	NH	Gov.	Clinton
Alcee Hastings	FL	Rep.	Clinton
Zack Hawkins	NC	DNC	Clinton
Carl Heastie	NY	DNC	Clinton
Denny Heck	WA	Rep.	Clinton
Martin Heinrich	NM	Sen.	Clinton
Heidi Heitkamp	ND	Sen.	Clinton
Jacquie Helt	MT	DNC	Clinton
Luis Heredia	AZ	DNC	Clinton
John Hickenlooper	CO	Gov.	Clinton
Brian Higgins	NY	Rep.	Clinton
Tony Hill	FL	DNC	Clinton
Gilberto Hinojosa	TX	DNC	Clinton
Rubén Hinojosa	TX	Rep.	Clinton
Jim Himes	CT	Rep.	Clinton
Mazie Hirono	HI	Sen.	Clinton
Pat Hobbs	CA	DNC	None
Marge Hoffa	MN	DNC	Clinton
Wayne Holland	UT	DNC	Sanders
Eleanor Holmes Norton	DC	Rep.	Clinton
Danny Homan	IA	DNC	Clinton
Mike Honda	CA	Rep.	Clinton
Steny Hoyer	MD	Rep.	Clinton
Fred Hudson	VA	DNC	Clinton
Alice Huffman	CA	DNC	Clinton
Jared Huffman	CA	Rep.	Clinton
Aleita Huguenin	CA	DNC	Clinton
Therese Hunkin	AS	DNC	Sanders
Daniel Hynes	IL	DNC	O'Malley
Harold Ickes	DC	DNC	Clinton
David Ige	HI	Gov.	None
Vince Insalaco	AR	DNC	Clinton
Jay Inslee	WA	Gov.	Clinton
Steve Israel	NY	Rep.	Clinton
Troy Jackson	ME	DNC	Sanders
Sheila Jackson Lee	TX	Rep.	Clinton
Victoria Jackson-Stanley	MD	DNC	None
Jay Jacobs	NY	DNC	Clinton
Nancy Jacobson	FL	DNC	Sanders
Sly James	MO	DNC	Clinton
Ben Jeffers	LA	DNC	None
Hakeem Jeffries	NY	Rep.	Clinton
Tim Jerman	VT	DNC	Sanders
Norwood Jewell	MI	DNC	None
Connie Johnson	OK	DNC	Sanders
Eddie Bernice Johnson	TX	Rep.	Clinton
Hank Johnson	GA	Rep.	Clinton
Lacy Johnson	IN	DNC	Clinton
Matt Johnson	CA	DNC	None
Gale Jones Carson	TN	DNC	Clinton
Ray Jordan	MA	DNC	Clinton
Tim Kaine	VA	Sen.	Clinton
Elaine Kamarck	MA	DNC	Clinton
Ron Kaminski	NE	DNC	Clinton
Marcy Kaptur	OH	Rep.	Sanders
William Keating	MA	Rep.	Clinton
Patsy Keever	NC	DNC	None
John Keller	IL	DNC	Clinton
Randy Kelley	AL	DNC	Clinton
Unzell Kelley	AL	DNC	Clinton
Robin Kelly	IL	Rep.	Clinton
Joe Kennedy III	MA	Rep.	Clinton
Ruben Kihuen	NV	DNC	Clinton
Dan Kildee	MI	Rep.	Clinton
Derek Kilmer	WA	Rep.	Clinton
Lee Kinch	KS	DNC	Clinton
Ron Kind	WI	Rep.	Clinton
Paul G. Kirk	MA	DPL	Sanders
Ann Kirkpatrick	AZ	Rep.	Clinton
Amy Klobuchar	MN	Sen.	Clinton
Kaye Koonce	SC	DNC	Clinton
Sarah Kovner	NY	DNC	Clinton
Debra Kozikowski	MA	DNC	Clinton
Caitlin Kraft-Buchman	DA	DNC	Clinton
Ann Kuster	NH	Rep.	Clinton
Andrew Lachman	CA	DNC	Clinton
William Laird IV	WV	DNC	Clinton
Roberta Lange	NV	DNC	Clinton
Jim Langevin	RI	Rep.	Clinton
Deborah Langhoff	LA	DNC	Clinton
Fagafaga Daniel Langkilde	AS	DNC	Clinton
Martha Laning	WI	DNC	Clinton
Rick Larsen	WA	Rep.	Clinton
Jim Larson	MT	DNC	Clinton
John B. Larson	CT	Rep.	Clinton
Warren Larson	ND	DNC	None
Brenda Lawrence	MI	Rep.	Clinton
Gerald Lawrence	PA	DNC	Clinton
Patrick Leahy	VT	Sen.	Clinton
Barbara Lee	CA	Rep.	Clinton
Sunita Leeds	DC	DNC	Clinton
Frank Leone	VA	DNC	Clinton
Bel Leong-Hong	MD	DNC	Clinton
Cindy Lerner	FL	DNC	Clinton
Sander Levin	MI	Rep.	Clinton
John Lewis	GA	Rep.	Clinton
Yvette Lewis	MD	DNC	Clinton
Ted Lieu	CA	Rep.	Clinton
Dan Lipinski	IL	Rep.	Sanders
John Litz	TN	DNC	Clinton
Dave Loebsack	IA	Rep.	Clinton
Zoe Lofgren	CA	Rep.	Clinton
Valerie Longhurst	DE	DNC	Clinton
Andrés W. López	PR	DNC	Clinton
Sandra Loridans	DA	DNC	Clinton
Martha Love	WI	DNC	Clinton
Evan Low	CA	DNC	Clinton
Joe Lowe	SD	DNC	Clinton
Alan Lowenthal	CA	Rep.	Clinton
Nita Lowey	NY	Rep.	Clinton
Juanita Luiz	WA	DNC	None
Ben R. Luján	NM	Rep.	Clinton
Michelle Lujan Grisham	NM	Rep.	Clinton
Charlotte Lundergan	KY	DNC	Clinton
Stephen F. Lynch	MA	Rep.	Clinton
Kerman Maddox	CA	DNC	Clinton
Michael Madigan	IL	DNC	Clinton
Mark Mallory	OH	DNC	Clinton
Dan Malloy	CT	Gov.	Clinton
Ronald Malone	OH	DNC	Clinton
Carolyn Maloney	NY	Rep.	Clinton
Sean Patrick Maloney	NY	Rep.	Clinton
Joe Manchin	WV	Sen.	Clinton
Mary Mancini	TN	DNC	Clinton
Jack Markell	DE	Gov.	Clinton
Ed Markey	MA	Sen.	Clinton
Bert Marley	ID	DNC	Sanders
Marcia Marley	NJ	DNC	Clinton
Pat Maroney	WV	DNC	Clinton
Ken Martin	MN	DNC	Clinton
Iris Martinez	IL	DNC	Clinton
Marcus Mason	CA	DNC	Clinton
Sharon Mast	WA	DNC	None
Doris Matsui	CA	Rep.	Clinton
Edna Mattson	RI	DNC	Clinton
Lupita Maurer	OR	DNC	Sanders
Glen Maxey	TX	DNC	None
Janet May	AL	DNC	Clinton
Jayne Mazzotti	IL	DNC	Clinton
Terry McAuliffe	VA	Gov.	Clinton
Valarie McCall	OH	DNC	Clinton
Claire McCaskill	MO	Sen.	Clinton
Jennifer McClellan	VA	DNC	Clinton
Kenneth McClintock	PR	DNC	Clinton
Betty McCollum	MN	Rep.	None
Melody McCray-Miller	KS	DNC	Clinton
Dustin McDaniel	AR	DNC	Clinton
Jim McDermott	WA	Rep.	Clinton
David McDonald	WA	DNC	None
Betty McElderry	OK	DNC	Clinton
Mattie McFadden-Lawson	CA	DNC	Clinton
Thomas M. McGee	MA	DNC	Clinton
Jim McGovern	MA	Rep.	Clinton
Andy McGuire	IA	DNC	None
R. Michael McHale	LA	DNC	None
Rhine McLin	OH	DNC	Clinton
Marv McMoore Jr.	NY	DNC	None
Joseph McNamara	RI	DNC	Clinton
Jerry McNerney	CA	Rep.	Clinton
Gregory Meeks	NY	Rep.	Clinton
Shari Mellin	IN	DNC	Clinton
Bob Menendez	NJ	Sen.	Clinton
Grace Meng	NY	Rep.	Clinton
Jeff Merkley	OR	Sen.	Sanders
Kim Metcalfe	AK	DNC	Clinton
Glenard S. Middleton Sr.	MD	DNC	None
Barbara Mikulski	MD	Sen.	Clinton
Breanne Miller	UT	DNC	Clinton
Lorraine Miller	TX	DNC	None
Nancy Mills	PA	DNC	Clinton
Stephanie Miner	NY	DNC	Clinton
George J. Mitchell	NY	DPL	Clinton
Heather Mizeur	MD	DNC	Sanders
Lolo Matalasi Moliga	AS	Gov.	Clinton
Maureen Monahan	NE	DNC	Sanders
Walter Mondale	MN	DPL	Clinton
Frank Montanaro	RI	DNC	Clinton
Charles E. Moore	KY	DNC	None
Gwen Moore	WI	Rep.	Clinton
Minyon Moore	DC	DNC	Clinton
Javier Morillo-Alicea	MN	DNC	Clinton
Arthur Morrell	LA	DNC	Clinton
Bruce Morrison	MD	DNC	Clinton
Seth Moulton	MA	Rep.	Clinton
Dorothy Mrowka	CT	DNC	Clinton
Bob Mulholland	CA	DNC	Clinton
Henry Muñoz III	TX	DNC	None
Larry Murakami	AK	DNC	Sanders
Chris Murphy	CT	Sen.	Clinton
Joan Patricia Murphy	IL	DNC	None
Patrick Murphy	FL	Rep.	Clinton
Ian Murray	PA	DNC	Clinton
Patty Murray	WA	Sen.	Clinton
Jerrold Nadler	NY	Rep.	Clinton
Grace Napolitano	CA	Rep.	Clinton
Katie Naranjo	TX	DNC	Clinton
Richard Neal	MA	Rep.	Clinton
Bill Nelson	FL	Sen.	Clinton
Jadine Nielsen	HI	DNC	Clinton
Jay Nixon	MO	Gov.	Clinton
Chad Nodland	ND	DNC	Sanders
Rick Nolan	MN	Rep.	Sanders
Donald Norcross	NJ	Rep.	None
George Norcross	NJ	DNC	None
Michael Nutter	PA	DNC	Clinton
David O'Brien	MA	DNC	Clinton
Blanca O'Leary	CO	DNC	Clinton
Beto O'Rourke	TX	Rep.	Clinton
Barack Obama	IL	DPL	Clinton
Carlos Odio	FL	DNC	None
Russell Okata	HI	DNC	Clinton
John Olsen	CT	DNC	Clinton
Ian Olson	AK	DNC	None
Danica Oparnica	AZ	DNC	Sanders
Sandy Opstvedt	IA	DNC	Clinton
Liza M. Ortiz	PR	DNC	None
Sannie Overly	KY	DNC	None
Kylie Oversen	ND	DNC	None
William Owen	TN	DNC	Clinton
Karen Packer	OR	DNC	Clinton
Lisa Padilla	CO	DNC	None
Rick Palacio	CO	DNC	None
Frank Pallone	NJ	Rep.	Clinton
Bruce Palmer	WY	DNC	Clinton
Bill Pascrell	NJ	Rep.	Clinton
John Patrick	TX	DNC	None
Johnnie Patton	MS	DNC	Sanders
Donald Payne Jr.	NJ	Rep.	Clinton
Gregory Pecoraro	MD	DNC	Clinton
Christine Pelosi	CA	DNC	Clinton
Nancy Pelosi	CA	Rep.	Clinton
Carol Pensky	MD	DNC	Clinton
David A. Pepper	OH	DNC	Clinton
John Perdue	WV	DNC	Clinton
Joaquin Perez	GU	DNC	Clinton
John Pérez	CA	DNC	Clinton
Ed Perlmutter	CO	Rep.	Clinton
Theresita B. Pertudo	MP	DNC	Clinton
Gary Peters	MI	Sen.	Clinton
Scott Peters	CA	Rep.	Clinton
Collin Peterson	MN	Rep.	Sanders
Greg Pettis	CA	DNC	Clinton
Renee Pfenning	ND	DNC	None
Fredericka Phillips	TX	DNC	None
Pedro Pierluisi	PR	Rep.	Clinton
Chellie Pingree	ME	Rep.	Clinton
Stacey Plaskett	VI	Rep.	Clinton
Mark Pocan	WI	Rep.	Clinton
Jared Polis	CO	Rep.	Clinton
Bruce Poole	MD	DNC	Clinton
Karren Pope-Onwukwe	MD	DNC	Clinton
DuBose Porter	GA	DNC	Clinton
Ed Potillo	DC	DNC	Clinton
Steven Powell	IL	DNC	Clinton
Vincent Powers	NE	DNC	None
Roberto Prats	PR	DNC	Clinton
David Price	NC	Rep.	Clinton
Carrie Pugh	DC	DNC	Clinton
Nancy Quarles	MI	DNC	None
Sandy Querry	MO	DNC	Clinton
Mike Quigley	IL	Rep.	Clinton
Christine Quinn	NY	DNC	Clinton
Jake Quinn	NC	DNC	Sanders
Jorge Quintana	MT	DNC	Clinton
Karl Racine	DC	DNC	Clinton
Jason Rae	WI	DNC	Clinton
Evie Rafalko McNulty	PA	DNC	Clinton
Gina Raimondo	RI	Gov.	Clinton
Andres Ramirez	NV	DNC	Clinton
Rion Ramirez	WA	DNC	Clinton
Charles Rangel	NY	Rep.	Clinton
Jaxon Ravens	WA	DNC	None
Stephanie Rawlings-Blake	MD	DNC	None
Richard Ray	GA	DNC	None
Jack Reed	RI	Sen.	Clinton
Kasim Reed	GA	DNC	Clinton
Steve Regenstreif	DC	DNC	Clinton
Clara Reid	AS	DNC	Clinton
Harry Reid	NV	Sen.	Clinton
Ed Rendell	PA	DPL	Clinton
Rory Respicio	GU	DNC	Clinton
Laura Ricketts	IL	DNC	Clinton
Betty Ritchie	TX	DNC	Clinton
Dennis Rivera	NY	DNC	Clinton
Matt Robinson	MO	DNC	None
Bill Roe	AZ	DNC	None
José R. Rodríguez	TX	DNC	Clinton
Mannie Rodriguez	CO	DNC	Clinton
Roy Romer	CO	DPL	Clinton
Carol Ronen	IL	DNC	Clinton
Valerie Brady Rongey	WA	DNC	Clinton
James Roosevelt	MA	DNC	None
Ellen Rosenblum	OR	DNC	Clinton
Sally Rosser	GA	DNC	Clinton
Bill Roy Jr.	KS	DNC	Clinton
Lucille Roybal-Allard	CA	Rep.	Clinton
Kathleen Rice	NY	Rep.	Clinton
Cedric Richmond	LA	Rep.	Clinton
Virgie Rollins	MI	DNC	None
Joe Rugola	OH	DNC	Clinton
Raul Ruiz	CA	Rep.	Clinton
Dutch Ruppersberger	MD	Rep.	Clinton
Bobby Rush	IL	Rep.	Clinton
Tim Ryan	OH	Rep.	Clinton
R. T. Rybak	MN	DNC	None
Shauna Ryder Diggs	MI	DNC	Clinton
Beverly Ryken	CO	DNC	None
Gregorio Sablan	MP	Rep.	Clinton
Pamela R. Samuel	VI	DNC	None
Juan Sanchez	NM	DNC	Clinton
Linda Sánchez	CA	Rep.	Clinton
Loretta Sanchez	CA	Rep.	Clinton
Raymond Sanchez	NM	DNC	Clinton
Bernie Sanders	VT	Sen.	Sanders
Keelan Sanders	MS	DNC	Sanders
John Sarbanes	MD	Rep.	Clinton
Lee Saunders	DC	DNC	Clinton
Peggy Schaffer	ME	DNC	Clinton
Jan Schakowsky	IL	Rep.	Clinton
Brian Schatz	HI	Sen.	Clinton
Adam Schiff	CA	Rep.	Clinton
Kurt Schrader	OR	Rep.	Clinton
Nancy Schumacher	MN	DNC	Clinton
Chuck Schumer	NY	Sen.	Clinton
Bobby Scott	VA	Rep.	Clinton
David Scott	GA	Rep.	Clinton
Lori Sellner	MN	DNC	Clinton
José E. Serrano	NY	Rep.	Clinton
Terri Sewell	AL	Rep.	Clinton
Lottie Shackelford	AR	DNC	Clinton
Billy Shaheen	NH	DNC	Clinton
Jeanne Shaheen	NH	Sen.	Clinton
Garry Shay	CA	DNC	Clinton
Brad Sherman	CA	Rep.	Clinton
Ken Sherman	DA	DNC	Clinton
Peter Shumlin	VT	Gov.	Clinton
Kyrsten Sinema	AZ	Rep.	None
Darryl Sinkfield	AL	DNC	Clinton
Albio Sires	NJ	Rep.	Clinton
Louise Slaughter	NY	Rep.	Clinton
Adam Smith	WA	Rep.	Clinton
Hilda Solis	CA	DNC	Clinton
Katie Solon	DA	DNC	None
Lenora Sorola-Pohlman	TX	DNC	Clinton
Jackie Speier	CA	Rep.	Clinton
Dennis Speight	TX	DNC	Clinton
Debbie Stabenow	MI	Sen.	Clinton
Rick Stafford	MN	DNC	Clinton
Christopher Stampolis	CA	DNC	Clinton
Casey Steinau	AK	DNC	None
Pam Stephenson	GA	DNC	Clinton
Paul Strauss	DC	Sen.	Clinton
Dolly Strazar	HI	DNC	None
Sharon Stroschein	SD	DNC	None
Joanne Sullivan	CT	DNC	None
Kathy Sullivan	NH	DNC	Clinton
Gary Suwannarat	DA	DNC	Sanders
Eric Swalwell	CA	Rep.	Clinton
Susan Swecker	VA	DNC	Clinton
Gerry Sweeney	NY	DNC	Clinton
Annette Taddeo	FL	DNC	Clinton
Taling M. Taitano	GU	DNC	Clinton
Mark Takano	CA	Rep.	Clinton
Alexis Tameron	AZ	DNC	None
Allison Tant	FL	DNC	Clinton
Marian Tasco	PA	DNC	Clinton
Larry Taylor	OR	DNC	Sanders
Roy Temple	MO	DNC	None
Natalie Tennant	WV	DNC	Clinton
Jon Tester	MT	Sen.	Clinton
Sarah Thomas-Nededog	GU	DNC	Clinton
Bennie Thompson	MS	Rep.	Clinton
Mike Thompson	CA	Rep.	Clinton
Senfronia Thompson	TX	DNC	None
Susan Thomson	MA	DNC	Clinton
Krystal Thrailkill	AR	DNC	Clinton
Dina Titus	NV	Rep.	Clinton
Andrew Tobias	FL	DNC	None
Earl Ray Tomblin	WV	Gov.	Clinton
Paul Tonko	NY	Rep.	Clinton
Ann Tornberg	SD	DNC	None
Norma Torres	CA	Rep.	Clinton
Niki Tsongas	MA	Rep.	Clinton
Shan Tsutsui	HI	DNC	Clinton
Galea'i Tu'ufuli	AS	DNC	Clinton
John Tunela	MP	DNC	Clinton
Tom Udall	NM	Sen.	Clinton
Keith Umemoto	CA	DNC	None
Karen Valentine	DE	DNC	Clinton
Chris Van Hollen	MD	Rep.	Clinton
Tim Vandeveer	HI	DNC	Sanders
Juan Vargas	CA	Rep.	Clinton
Marc Veasey	TX	Rep.	Clinton
Filemon Vela Jr.	TX	Rep.	Clinton
Nydia Velázquez	NY	Rep.	Clinton
Pete Visclosky	IN	Rep.	None
Rick Wade	DC	DNC	Clinton
Brian Wahby	MO	DNC	Clinton
George Wallace	VA	DNC	Clinton
Bill Walsh	SD	DNC	Clinton
Tim Walz	MN	Rep.	Clinton
Everett Ward	NC	DNC	None
Carolyn Warner	AZ	DNC	Clinton
Mark Warner	VA	Sen.	Clinton
Elizabeth Warren	MA	Sen.	Clinton
Debbie Wasserman Schultz	FL	Rep.	None
Maxine Waters	CA	Rep.	Clinton
Bonnie Watson Coleman	NJ	Rep.	Clinton
Randi Weingarten	NY	DNC	Clinton
Peter Welch	VT	Rep.	Sanders
Royce West	TX	DNC	Clinton
Nan Whaley	OH	DNC	Clinton
Sheldon Whitehouse	RI	Sen.	Clinton
Chris Wicker	NV	DNC	Clinton
Lona Wilbur	WA	DNC	None
David Wilhelm	OH	DPL	Clinton
Alan Williams	FL	DNC	Clinton
Arlanda Williams	LA	DNC	Clinton
Marian Williams	FL	DNC	None
Nikema Williams	GA	DNC	Clinton
Frederica Wilson	FL	Rep.	Clinton
Sylvia Wilson	PA	DNC	Clinton
John Wisniewski	NJ	DNC	Sanders
Tom Wolf	PA	Gov.	Clinton
David Worley	GA	DNC	Clinton
Nancy Worley	AL	DNC	Clinton
Ron Wyden	OR	Sen.	Clinton
Nancy Wyman	CT	DNC	Clinton
Rosalind Wyman	CA	DNC	Clinton
Karen Yarbrough	IL	DNC	Clinton
John Yarmuth	KY	Rep.	Clinton
Laurence Zakson	CA	DNC	Clinton
Patricia Zieg	NE	DNC	Clinton
Rob Zimmerman	NY	DNC	Clinton
John Zody	IN	DNC	None
James Zogby	DC	DNC	Sanders

== See also ==
- 2016 Democratic Party presidential primaries
- Results of the 2016 Democratic Party presidential primaries
- List of superdelegates at the 2008 Democratic National Convention
