= List of Democratic National Conventions =

Map of states that have hosted a Democratic National Convention

This is a list of Democratic National Conventions. These conventions are the presidential nominating conventions of the Democratic Party of the United States.

== List of Democratic National Conventions ==
- Conventions whose nominees won the subsequent presidential election are tinted in light blue.
- Four other conventions — in 1876, 1888, 2000, and 2016 — which nominated candidates who won the popular vote, but not the Electoral College, are tinted in pale yellow.

Dates	Year	Location	State	Temporary Chair	Permanent Chair	Platform	Ballots	Presidential Nominee	Vice Presidential Nominee
May 21–23	1832	The Athenaeum and Warfield's Church, Baltimore	Maryland	[data missing]	Robert Lucas of Ohio	–	1	Andrew Jackson of Tennessee^{1}	Martin Van Buren of New York
May 20–22	1835	Fourth Presbyterian Church, Baltimore	Maryland	[data missing]	Andrew Stevenson of Virginia	–	1	Martin Van Buren of New York	Richard Johnson of Kentucky
May 5–6	1840	The Assembly Rooms, Baltimore	Maryland	[data missing]	William Carroll of Tennessee	1840 platform	1	Martin Van Buren of New York	–^{2}
May 27–29	1844	Odd Fellows Hall, Baltimore	Maryland	[data missing]	Hendrick Bradley Wright of Pennsylvania	1844 platform	9	James K. Polk of Tennessee	George M. Dallas of Pennsylvania^{3}
May 22–25	1848	Universalist Church, Baltimore	Maryland	J. S. Bryce of Louisiana	Andrew Stevenson of Virginia	1848 platform	4	Lewis Cass of Michigan	William O. Butler of Kentucky
June 1–5	1852	Maryland Institute, Baltimore	Maryland	Romulus M. Saunders of North Carolina	John Davis of Indiana	1852 platform	49	Franklin Pierce of New Hampshire	William R. King of Alabama
June 2–6	1856	Smith and Nixon's Hall, Cincinnati	Ohio	[data missing]	John Elliot Ward of Georgia	1856 platform	17	James Buchanan of Pennsylvania	John C. Breckinridge of Kentucky
April 23–May 3	1860	South Carolina Institute Hall, Charleston	South Carolina	[data missing]	Caleb Cushing of Massachusetts	See below	57	Deadlocked	
June 18–23	1860	Front Street Theater, Baltimore	Maryland	[data missing]	Caleb Cushing of Massachusetts^{4} David Tod of Ohio	1860 N.D. platform	2	Stephen A. Douglas of Illinois^{5}	Herschel V. Johnson of Georgia^{5,6}
August 29–31	1864	The Amphitheatre, Chicago	Illinois	[data missing]	Horatio Seymour of New York	1864 platform	1	George B. McClellan of New Jersey	George H. Pendleton of Ohio
July 4–9	1868	Tammany Hall, New York City	New York	Henry L. Palmer of Wisconsin	Horatio Seymour of New York	1868 platform	22	Horatio Seymour of New York	Francis P. Blair Jr. of Missouri
July 9–10	1872^{7}	Ford's Grand Opera House, Baltimore	Maryland	Thomas Jefferson Randolph of Virginia	James R. Doolittle of Wisconsin	1872 platform	1	Horace Greeley of New York^{7}	B. Gratz Brown of Missouri^{7}
June 27–29	1876	Merchant's Exchange Building, St. Louis	Missouri	[data missing]	John A. McClernand of Illinois	1876 platform	2	Samuel J. Tilden of New York	Thomas A. Hendricks of Indiana
June 22–24	1880	Cincinnati Music Hall, Cincinnati	Ohio	George Hoadly of Ohio	John W. Stevenson of Kentucky	1880 platform	2	Winfield S. Hancock of Pennsylvania	William H. English of Indiana
July 8–11	1884	Interstate Exposition Building, Chicago	Illinois	Richard B. Hubbard of Texas	William F. Vilas of Wisconsin	1884 platform	2	Grover Cleveland of New York	Thomas A. Hendricks of Indiana
June 5–7	1888	Exposition Building, St. Louis	Missouri	[data missing]	Patrick Collins of Massachusetts	1888 platform	1	Grover Cleveland of New York	Allen G. Thurman of Ohio
June 21–23	1892	Wigwam, Chicago	Illinois	William Claiborne Owens of Kentucky	William Lyne Wilson of West Virginia	1892 platform	1	Grover Cleveland of New York	Adlai Stevenson I of Illinois
July 7–11	1896^{8}	Chicago Coliseum, Chicago	Illinois	John W. Daniel of Virginia	Stephen M. White of California	1896 platform	5	William Jennings Bryan of Nebraska^{9}	Arthur Sewall of Maine
July 4–6	1900	Convention Hall, Kansas City	Missouri	Charles Thomas of Colorado	James D. Richardson of Tennessee	1900 platform	1	William Jennings Bryan of Nebraska	Adlai Stevenson I of Illinois
July 6–9	1904	St. Louis Coliseum, St. Louis	Missouri	John Sharp Williams of Mississippi	Champ Clark of Missouri	1904 platform	1	Alton B. Parker of New York	Henry G. Davis of West Virginia
July 7–10	1908	Denver Auditorium Arena, Denver	Colorado	Theodore Bell of California	Henry D. Clayton of Alabama	1908 platform	1	William Jennings Bryan of Nebraska	John W. Kern of Indiana
June 25–July 2	1912	Fifth Regiment Armory, Baltimore	Maryland	Alton B. Parker of New York	Ollie M. James of Kentucky	1912 platform	46	Woodrow Wilson of New Jersey	Thomas R. Marshall of Indiana
June 14–16	1916	Convention Hall, St. Louis	Missouri	[data missing]	Ollie M. James of Kentucky	1916 platform	1	Woodrow Wilson of New Jersey (speech)	Thomas R. Marshall of Indiana
June 28–July 6	1920	Civic Auditorium, San Francisco	California	Homer Stille Cummings of Connecticut	Joseph T. Robinson of Arkansas	1920 platform	44	James M. Cox of Ohio	Franklin D. Roosevelt of New York
June 24–July 9	1924	Madison Square Garden, New York	New York	Martin H. Glynn of New York	Thomas J. Walsh of Montana	1924 platform	103	John W. Davis of New York	Charles W. Bryan of Nebraska
June 26–29	1928	Sam Houston Hall, Houston	Texas	[data missing]	Joseph T. Robinson of Arkansas	1928 platform	1	Al Smith of New York (speech)	Joseph T. Robinson of Arkansas
June 27–July 2	1932	Chicago Stadium, Chicago	Illinois	Alben W. Barkley of Kentucky	Thomas J. Walsh of Montana	1932 platform	4	Franklin D. Roosevelt of New York (speech)	John Nance Garner of Texas
June 23–27	1936	Convention Hall and Franklin Field, Philadelphia	Pennsylvania	[data missing]	Joseph T. Robinson of Arkansas	1936 platform	Acclamation	Franklin D. Roosevelt of New York (speech)	John Nance Garner of Texas
July 15–18	1940	Chicago Stadium, Chicago	Illinois	[data missing]	Alben W. Barkley of Kentucky	1940 platform	1	Franklin D. Roosevelt of New York (speech)	Henry A. Wallace of Iowa
July 19–21	1944	Chicago Stadium, Chicago	Illinois	Robert Kerr of Oklahoma	Samuel D. Jackson of Indiana	1944 platform	1	Franklin D. Roosevelt of New York (speech)	Harry S. Truman of Missouri
July 12–14	1948^{10}	Convention Hall, Philadelphia	Pennsylvania	[data missing]	Sam Rayburn of Texas	1948 platform	1	Harry S. Truman of Missouri (speech)	Alben W. Barkley of Kentucky
July 21–26	1952	International Amphitheatre, Chicago	Illinois	[data missing]	Sam Rayburn of Texas	1952 platform	3	Adlai Stevenson of Illinois (speech)	John Sparkman of Alabama
August 13–17	1956	International Amphitheatre, Chicago	Illinois	[data missing]	Sam Rayburn of Texas	1956 platform	1	Adlai Stevenson of Illinois (speech)	Estes Kefauver of Tennessee
July 11–15	1960	Memorial Sports Arena and Memorial Coliseum, Los Angeles	California	[data missing]	LeRoy Collins of Florida	1960 platform	1	John F. Kennedy of Massachusetts (speech)	Lyndon B. Johnson of Texas
August 24–27	1964	Convention Hall, Atlantic City	New Jersey	[data missing]	John W. McCormack of Massachusetts	1964 platform	Acclamation	Lyndon B. Johnson of Texas (speech)	Hubert Humphrey of Minnesota
August 26–29	1968	International Amphitheatre, Chicago	Illinois	[data missing]	Carl Albert of Oklahoma	1968 platform	1	Hubert Humphrey of Minnesota (speech)	Edmund Muskie of Maine
July 10–13	1972	Miami Beach Convention Center, Miami Beach	Florida	Daniel Inouye of Hawaii	Lawrence F. O'Brien of Massachusetts	1972 platform	1	George McGovern of South Dakota (speech)	Thomas Eagleton of Missouri^{11}
July 12–15	1976	Madison Square Garden, New York	New York	[data missing]	Lindy Boggs of Louisiana	1976 platform	1	Jimmy Carter of Georgia (speech)	Walter Mondale of Minnesota
August 11–14	1980	Madison Square Garden, New York	New York	[data missing]	Tip O'Neill of Massachusetts	1980 platform	1	Jimmy Carter of Georgia (speech)	Walter Mondale of Minnesota
July 16–19	1984	Moscone Center, San Francisco	California	[data missing]	Martha Layne Collins of Kentucky	1984 platform	1	Walter Mondale of Minnesota (speech)	Geraldine Ferraro of New York
July 18–21	1988	The Omni, Atlanta	Georgia	[data missing]	Jim Wright of Texas	1988 platform	1	Michael Dukakis of Massachusetts (speech)	Lloyd Bentsen of Texas
July 13–16	1992	Madison Square Garden, New York	New York	[data missing]	Ann Richards of Texas	1992 platform	1	Bill Clinton of Arkansas (speech)	Al Gore of Tennessee
August 26–29	1996	United Center, Chicago	Illinois	[data missing]	Dick Gephardt of Missouri; Tom Daschle of South Dakota	1996 platform	Acclamation	Bill Clinton of Arkansas (speech)	Al Gore of Tennessee
August 14–17	2000	Staples Center, Los Angeles	California	[data missing]	Terry McAuliffe of New York	2000 platform	Acclamation	Al Gore of Tennessee (speech)	Joe Lieberman of Connecticut
July 26–29	2004	FleetCenter, Boston	Massachusetts	[data missing]	Bill Richardson of New Mexico	2004 platform	1	John Kerry of Massachusetts (speech)	John Edwards of North Carolina
August 25–28	2008	Pepsi Center and Invesco Field, Denver	Colorado	Howard Dean of Vermont	Nancy Pelosi of California	2008 platform	1 / Acclamation	Barack Obama of Illinois (speech)	Joe Biden of Delaware
September 4–6	2012	Time Warner Cable Arena, Charlotte	North Carolina	Debbie Wasserman Schultz of Florida	Antonio Villaraigosa of California	2012 platform	1 / Acclamation	Barack Obama of Illinois (speech)	Joe Biden of Delaware
July 25–28	2016	Wells Fargo Center, Philadelphia	Pennsylvania	Stephanie Rawlings-Blake of Maryland^{12}	Marcia Fudge of Ohio	2016 platform	1	Hillary Clinton of New York (speech)	Tim Kaine of Virginia
August 17–20^{13}	2020	Wisconsin Center, Milwaukee; Various locations remotely^{14}	Wisconsin	Not chosen	Bennie Thompson of Mississippi	2020 platform	1	Joe Biden of Delaware (speech)	Kamala Harris of California
August 19–22	2024	United Center, Chicago	Illinois	TBA	Minyon Moore of Illinois	2024 platform	1	Kamala Harris of California (speech)	Tim Walz of Minnesota
August 7–10	2028	TBD	TBD	TBD	TBD	TBD	TBD	TBD	TBD

Footnotes

^{1}[1832] A resolution endorsing "the repeated nominations which he [Jackson] has received in various parts of the Union" was passed by the convention.
^{2}[1840] A resolution stating "that the convention deem it expedient at the present time not to choose between the individuals in nomination, but to leave the decision to their Republican fellow-citizens in the several states" was passed by the convention. Most Van Buren electors voted for Richard Mentor Johnson of Kentucky for the vice presidency; others voted for Littleton Waller Tazewell of Virginia and James K. Polk of Tennessee in the election of 1840.
^{3}[1844] Silas Wright of New York was first nominated and he declined the nomination.
^{4}[1860 June] Caleb Cushing resigned as permanent chair.
^{5}[1860 June] Douglas and Johnson were chosen as the candidates of the Front Street Theater convention after most of the Southern delegations walked out. The convention bolters soon formed their own convention, located at the Maryland Institute, also in Baltimore, on June 28, 1860. At their convention Caleb Cushing again served as permanent chair and John C. Breckinridge of Kentucky was nominated for the presidency and Joseph Lane of Oregon was nominated for the vice presidency. (1860 Southern Democratic platform)
^{6}[1860 June] Benjamin Fitzpatrick of Alabama was first nominated but he declined the nomination.
^{7}[1872] Greeley and B. Gratz Brown had already been endorsed by the Liberal Republican Party, meeting on May 1 in Cincinnati. A dissident group of Straight-Out Democrats, meeting in Louisville, Kentucky on September 3, nominated Charles O'Conor of New York for President and John Quincy Adams II of Massachusetts for Vice President, but both men declined the nomination.
^{8}[1896] "Gold" Democrats opposed to the Free Silver plank of the 1896 platform and to Wm J. Bryan's candidacy convened as the National Democratic Party in Indianapolis on September 2, and nominated John M. Palmer of Illinois for President and former Governor Simon Bolivar Buckner of Kentucky for Vice President.
^{9}[1896] Bryan was later nominated for President in St. Louis, together with Thomas E. Watson of Georgia for Vice President, by the National Silver Republican Party meeting on July 22, and by the People's Party (Populists) meeting on July 25.
^{10}[1948] Breakaway delegations left the Philadelphia Convention for conventions of the Progressive and States Rights Democratic parties. The Progressives, meeting on July 23, also in Philadelphia, nominated former Vice President Henry A. Wallace of Iowa for President and Senator Glen H. Taylor of Idaho for Vice President. (1948 Progressive Party platform)
The States' Rights Democrats (or "Dixiecrats"), meeting in Birmingham, Alabama on July 17, nominated Governors Strom Thurmond of South Carolina for President and Fielding Wright of Mississippi for Vice President. (1948 States' Rights Democratic platform)
^{11}[1972] Eagleton withdrew his candidacy after the convention and was replaced by Sargent Shriver of Maryland.
^{12}[2016] Debbie Wasserman Schultz of Florida was intended to be the Temporary Chair, but the Democratic National Committee replaced her with Stephanie Rawlings-Blake in the wake of the Wasserman Schultz/DNC e-mail leak scandal. Wasserman Schultz resigned as Chairman of the Democratic National Committee effective after the close of the convention.
^{13}[2020] Originally scheduled for July 13–16, and originally planned for the Fiserv Forum, but postponed and moved due to the COVID-19 pandemic.
^{14}[2020] Centered in Milwaukee, but many speeches and roll call responses were given remotely due to the COVID-19 pandemic.

== Keynote speakers ==
- 1896 – U.S. Senator John W. Daniel of Virginia
- 1900 – Governor Charles S. Thomas of Colorado
- 1904 – U.S. Representative John Sharp Williams of Mississippi
- 1908 – U.S. Representative Theodore Bell of California
- 1912 – Chief Judge Alton B. Parker of New York
- 1916 – Governor Martin Glynn of New York
- 1920 – DNC Chair Homer Cummings of Connecticut
- 1924 – U.S. Senator Pat Harrison of Mississippi
- 1928 – Claude Bowers of New York
- 1932 – U.S. Senator Alben Barkley of Kentucky
- 1936 – U.S. Senator Alben Barkley of Kentucky and U.S. Senator Joseph Robinson of Arkansas
- 1940 – U.S. Representative William Bankhead of Alabama
- 1944 – Governor Robert Kerr of Oklahoma
- 1948 – U.S. Senator Alben Barkley of Kentucky
- 1952 – Governor Paul Dever of Massachusetts
- 1956 – Governor Frank Clement of Tennessee
- 1960 – U.S. Senator Frank Church of Idaho
- 1964 – U.S. Senator John O. Pastore of Rhode Island
- 1968 – U.S. Senator Daniel Inouye of Hawaii
- 1972 – Governor Reubin Askew of Florida
- 1976 – U.S. Representative Barbara Jordan of Texas and U.S. Senator John Glenn of Ohio
- 1980 – U.S. Representative Mo Udall of Arizona
- 1984 – Governor Mario Cuomo of New York
- 1988 – State Treasurer Ann Richards of Texas
- 1992 – U.S. Senator Bill Bradley of New Jersey, U.S. Representative Barbara Jordan of Texas, and Governor Zell Miller of Georgia
- 1996 – Governor Evan Bayh of Indiana
- 2000 – U.S. Representative Harold Ford Jr. of Tennessee
- 2004 – State Senator Barack Obama of Illinois
- 2008 – Governor Mark Warner of Virginia
- 2012 – Mayor Julián Castro of Texas
- 2016 – U.S. Senator Elizabeth Warren of Massachusetts
- 2020 – 17 speakers
- 2024 – County Executive Angela Alsobrooks of Maryland

== Gallery of convention sites ==
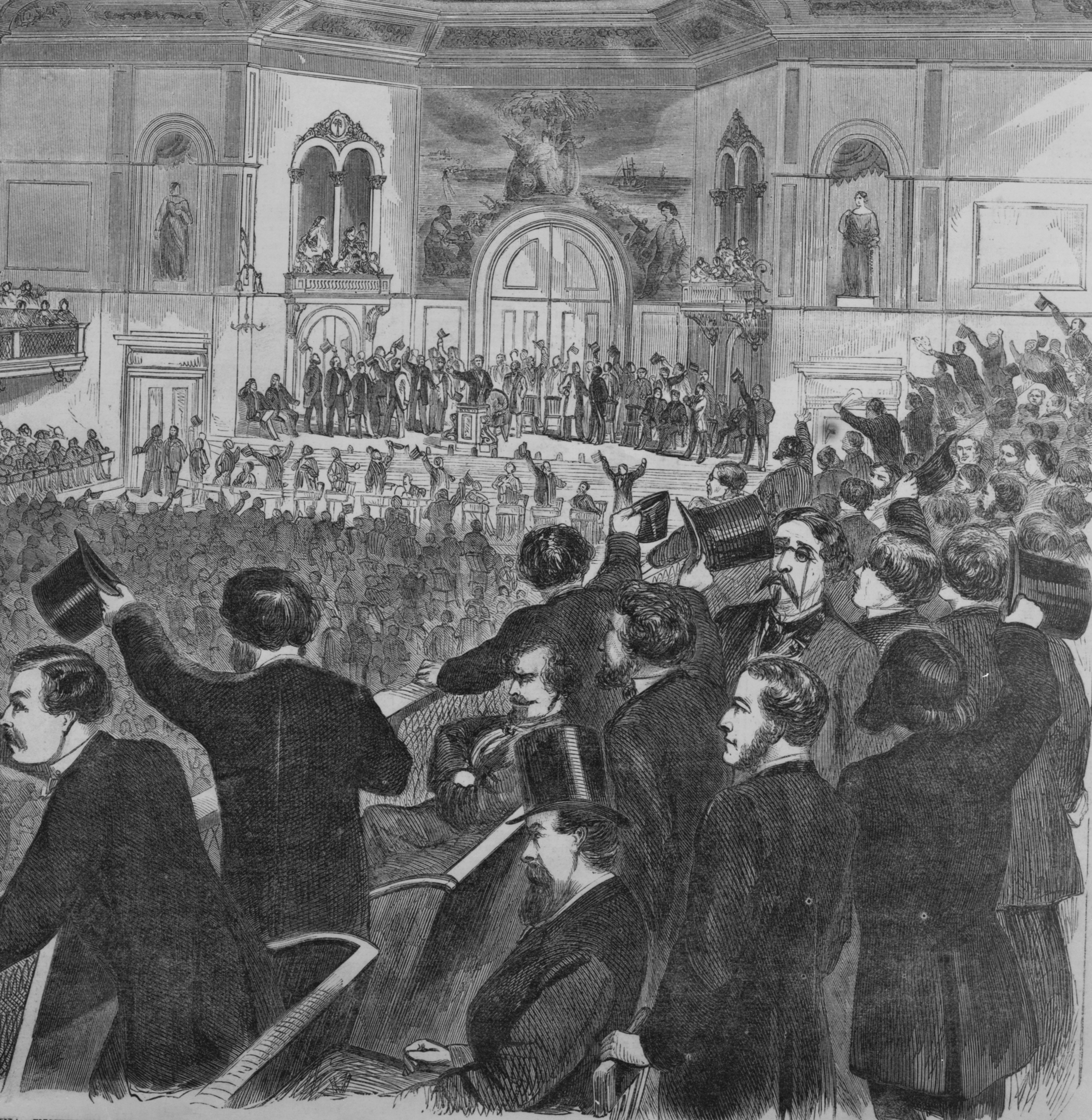
Wood engraving of the failed 1860 Charleston convention

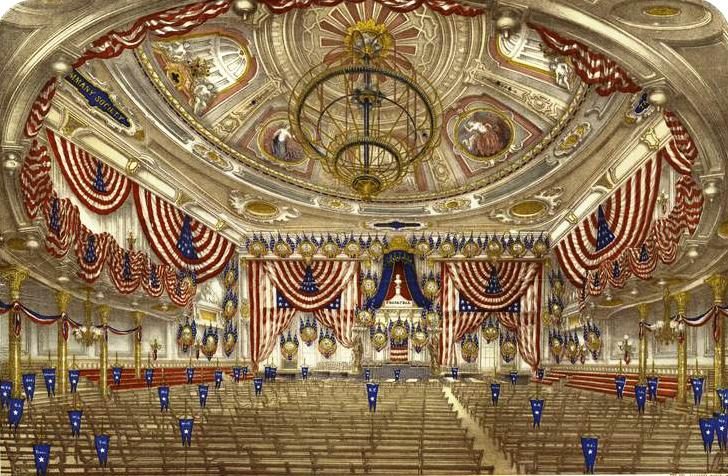
Tammany Hall decorated for the 1868 convention

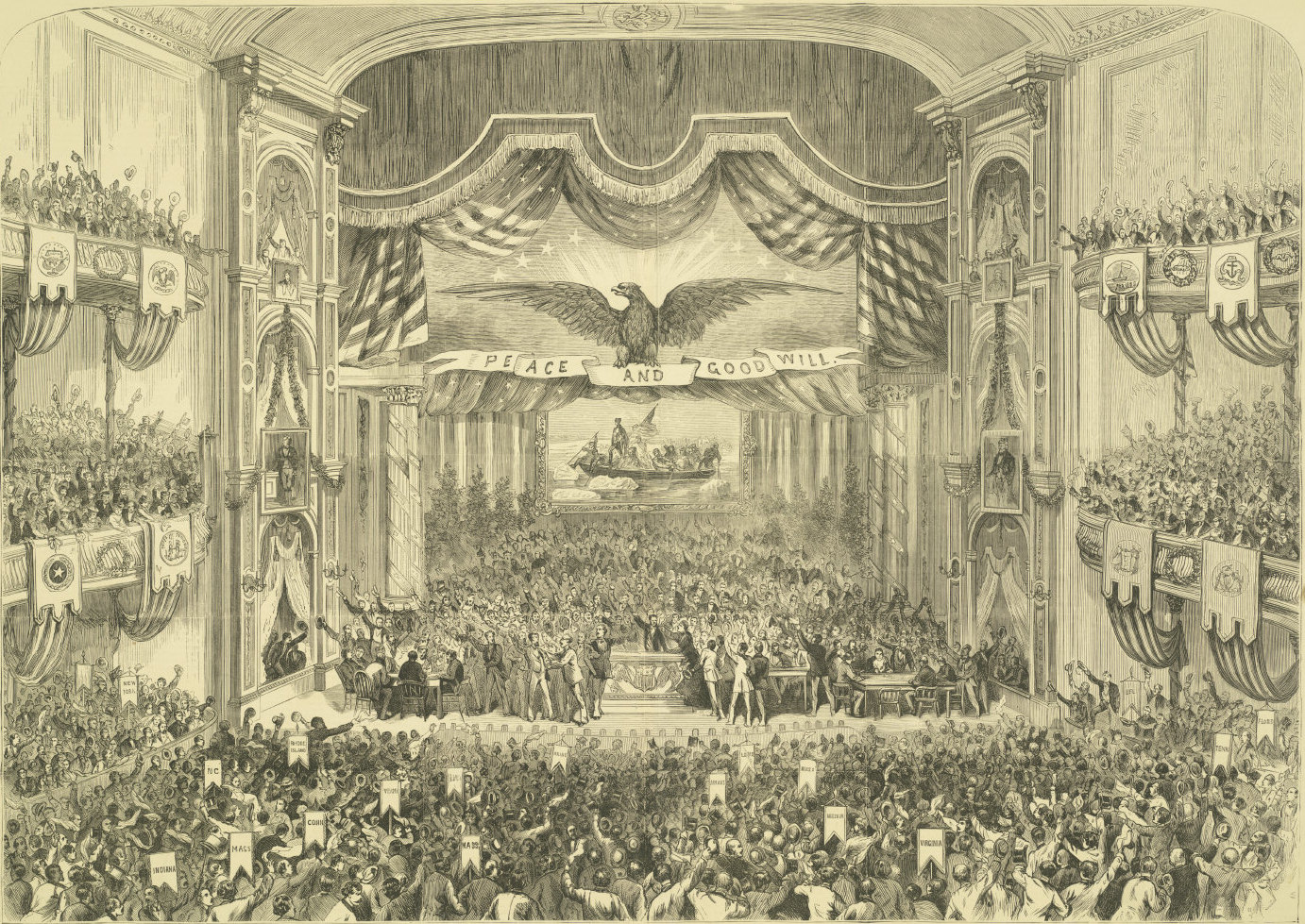
Interior of Ford's Grand Opera House during the 1872 convention

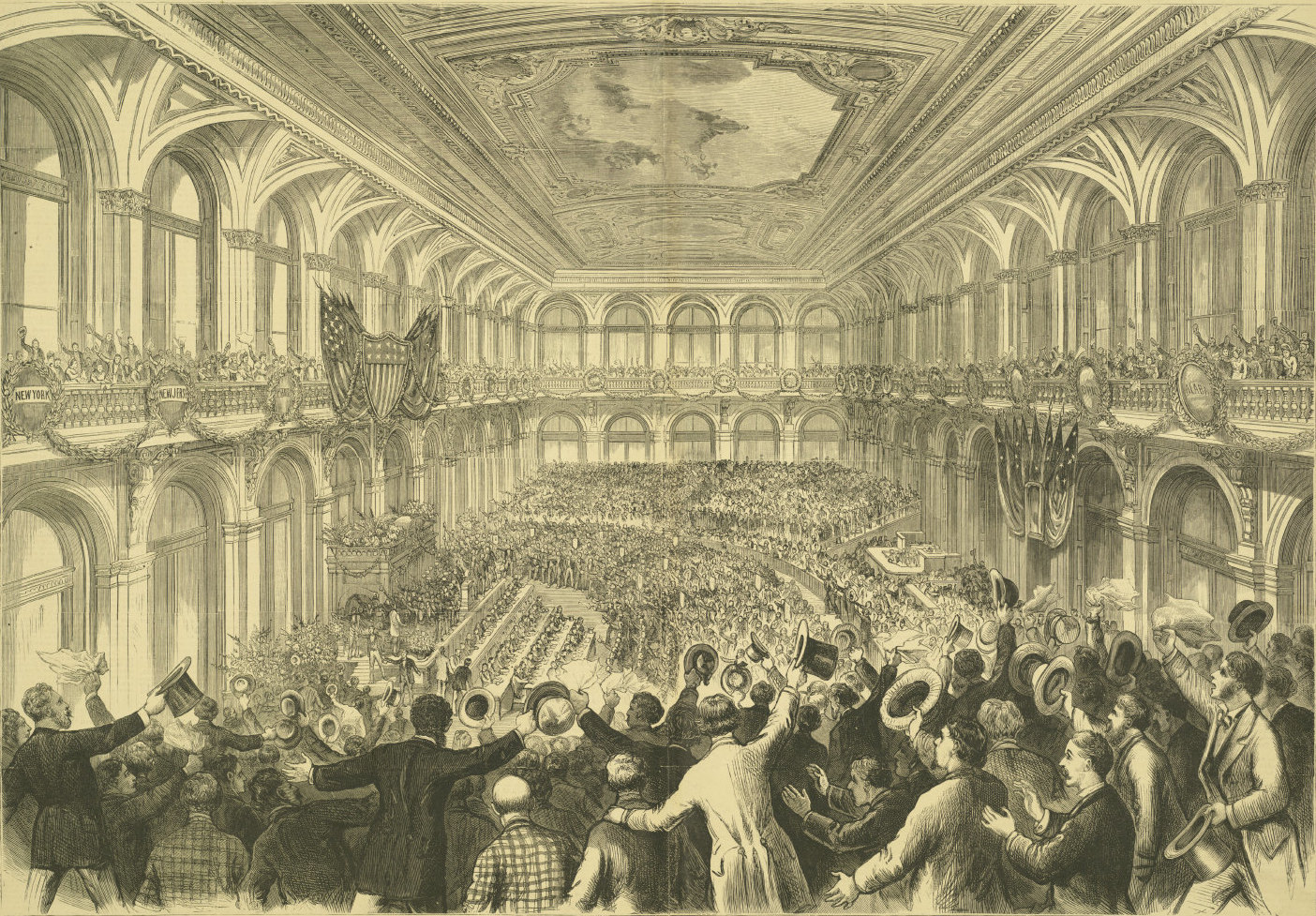
1876 convention

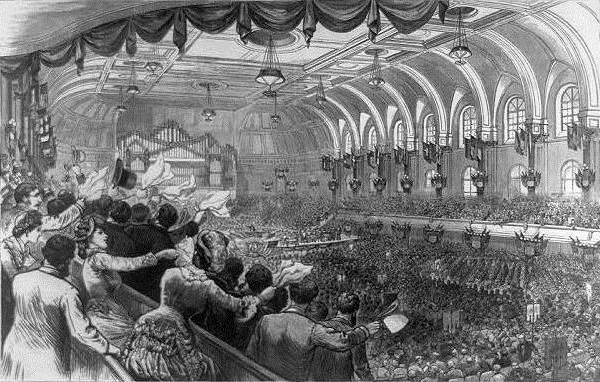
1880 convention.

Diagram of Convention Hall, Chicago, site of the 1884 convention

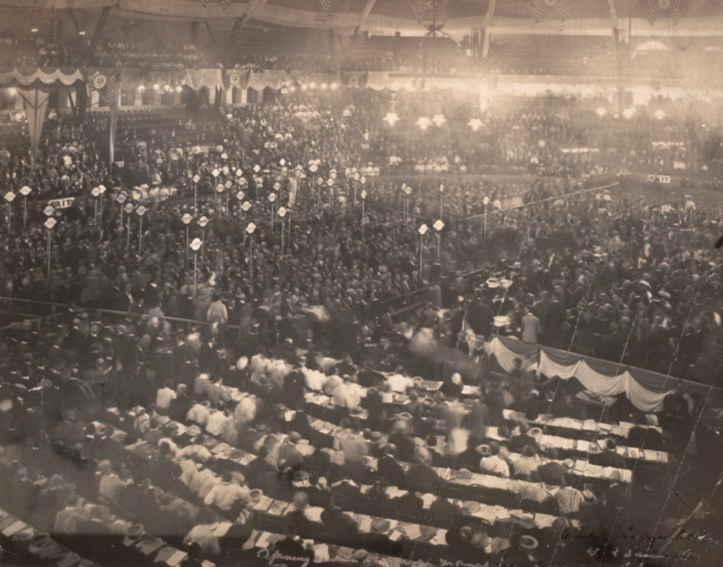
Opening session at the 1904 convention

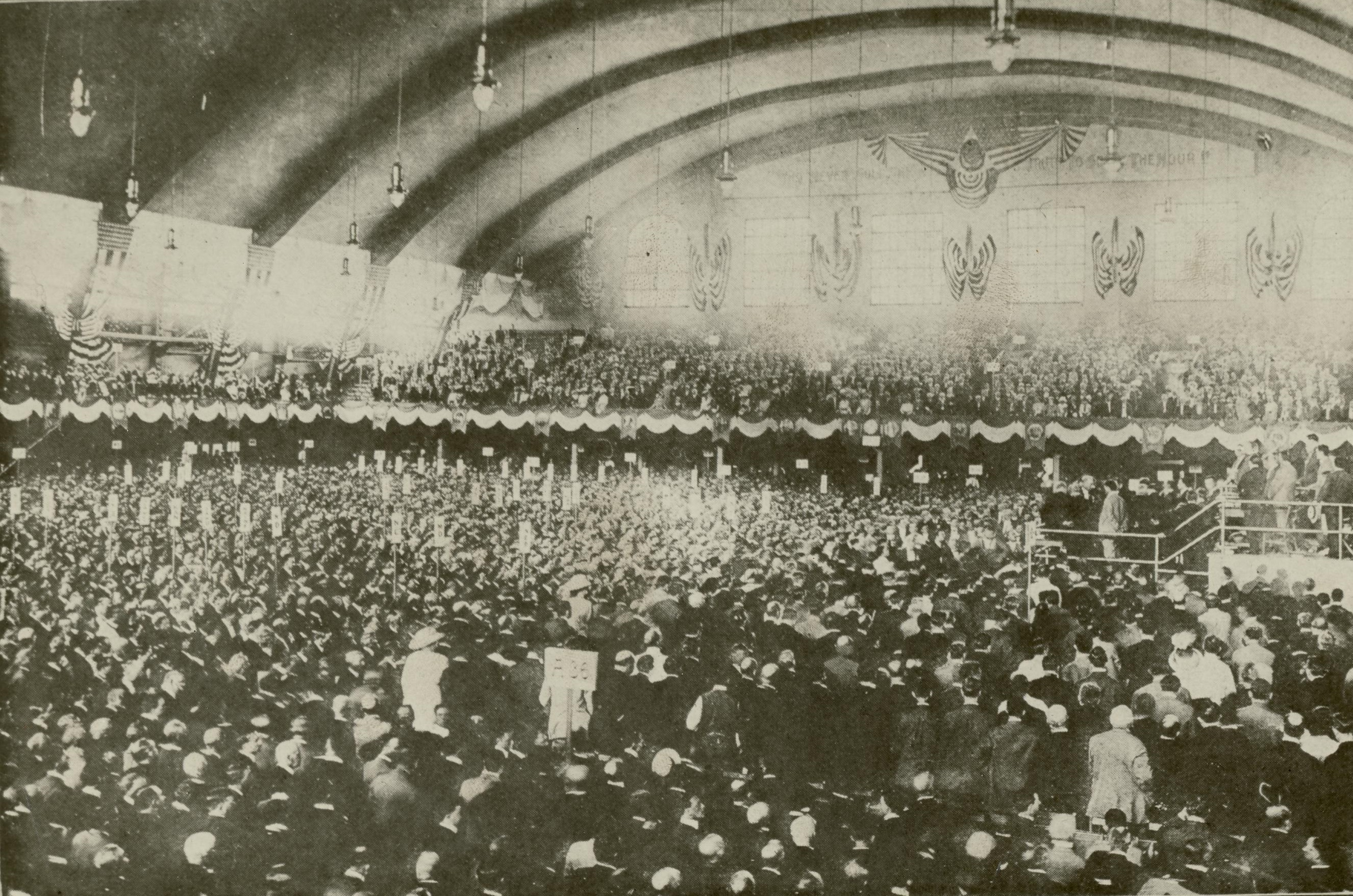
1912 convention in-session

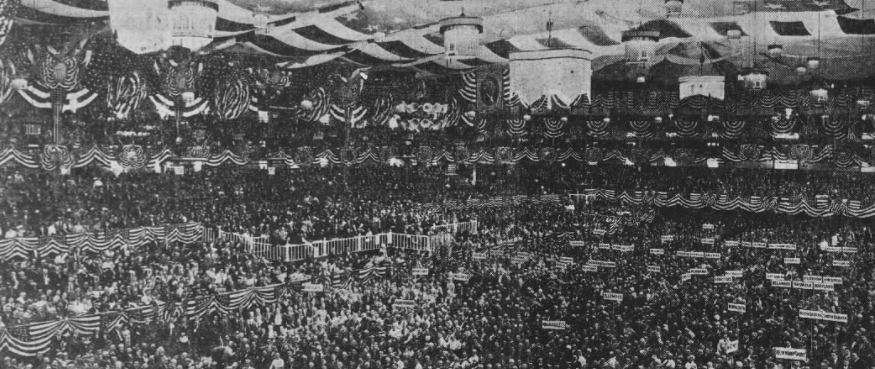
1924 convention in-session

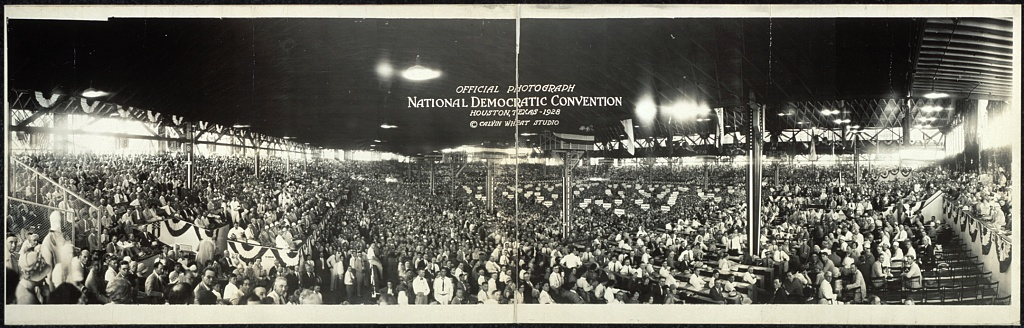
Photograph of the 1928 convention

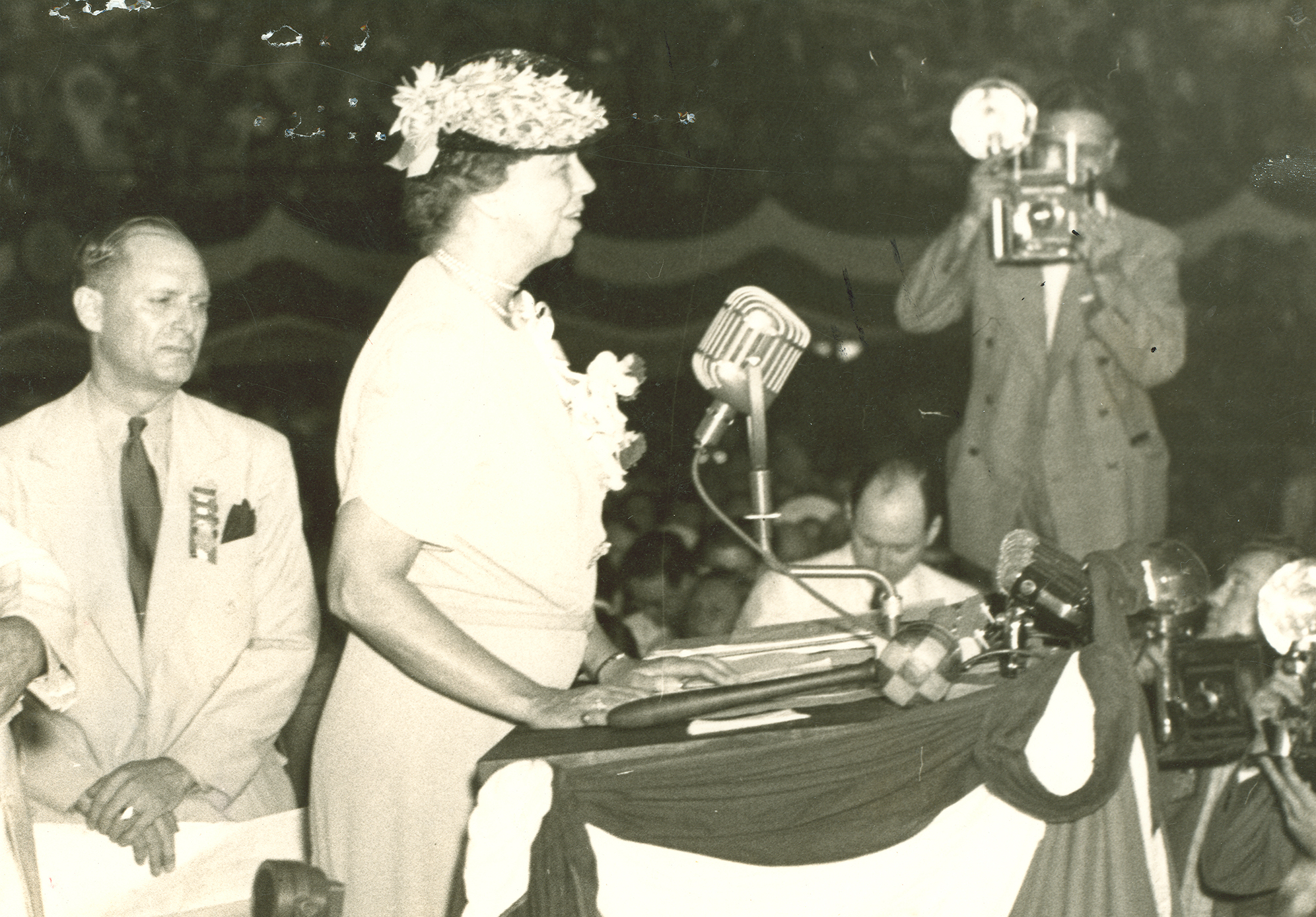
First Lady Eleanor Roosevelt delivering her speech at the 1940 convention

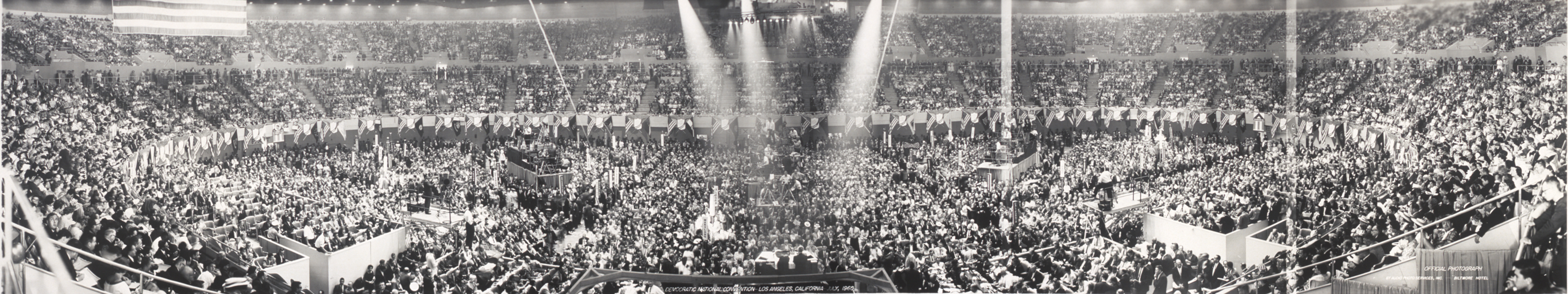
1960 convention hall

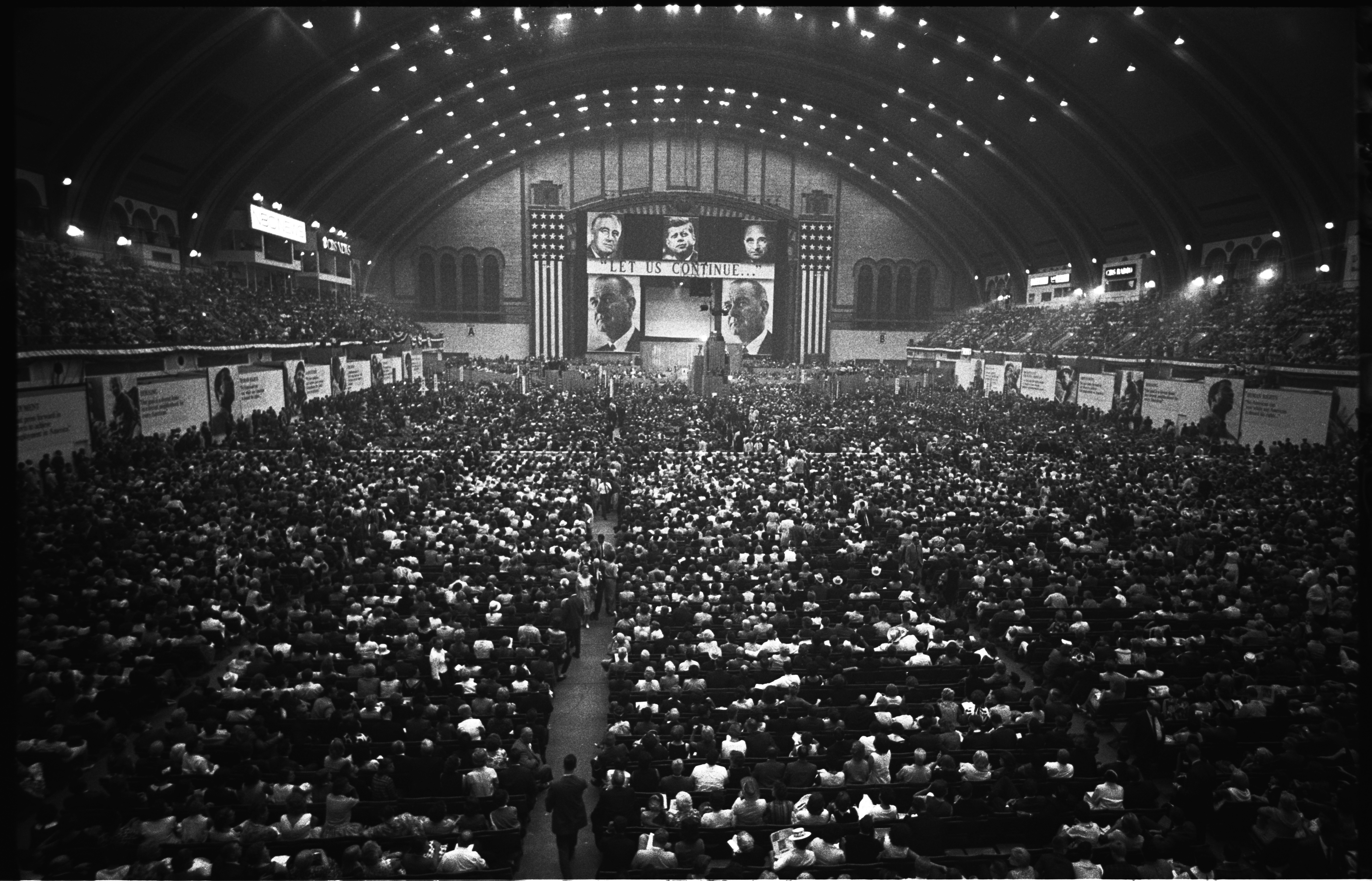
1964 convention floor

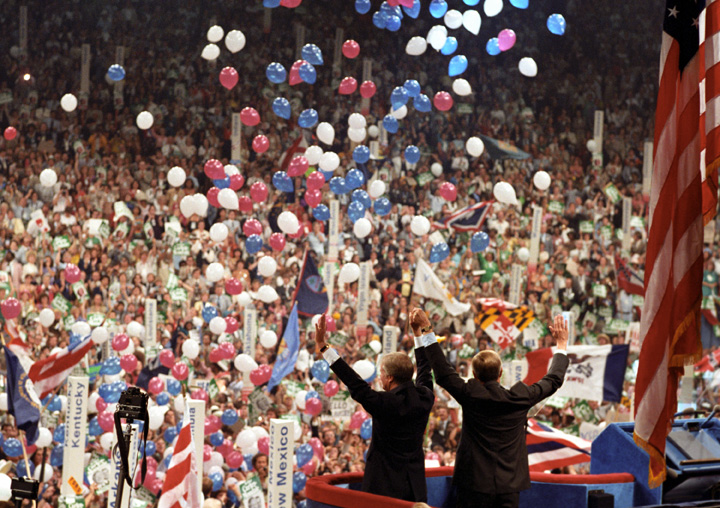
Carter and Mondale stand together at the end of the 1976 convention

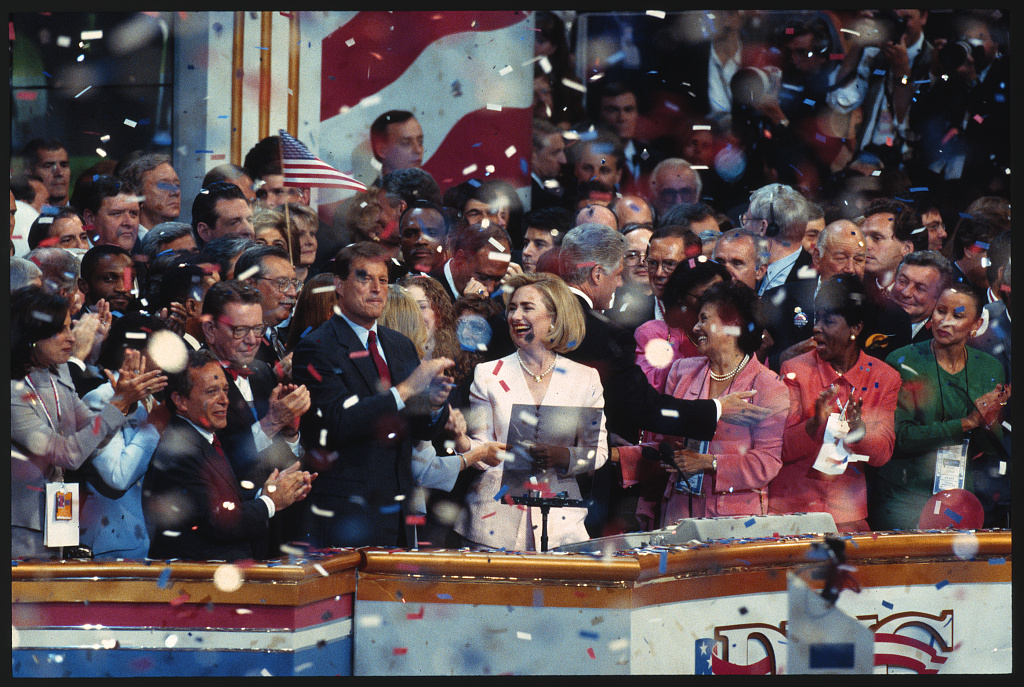
1996 convention hall

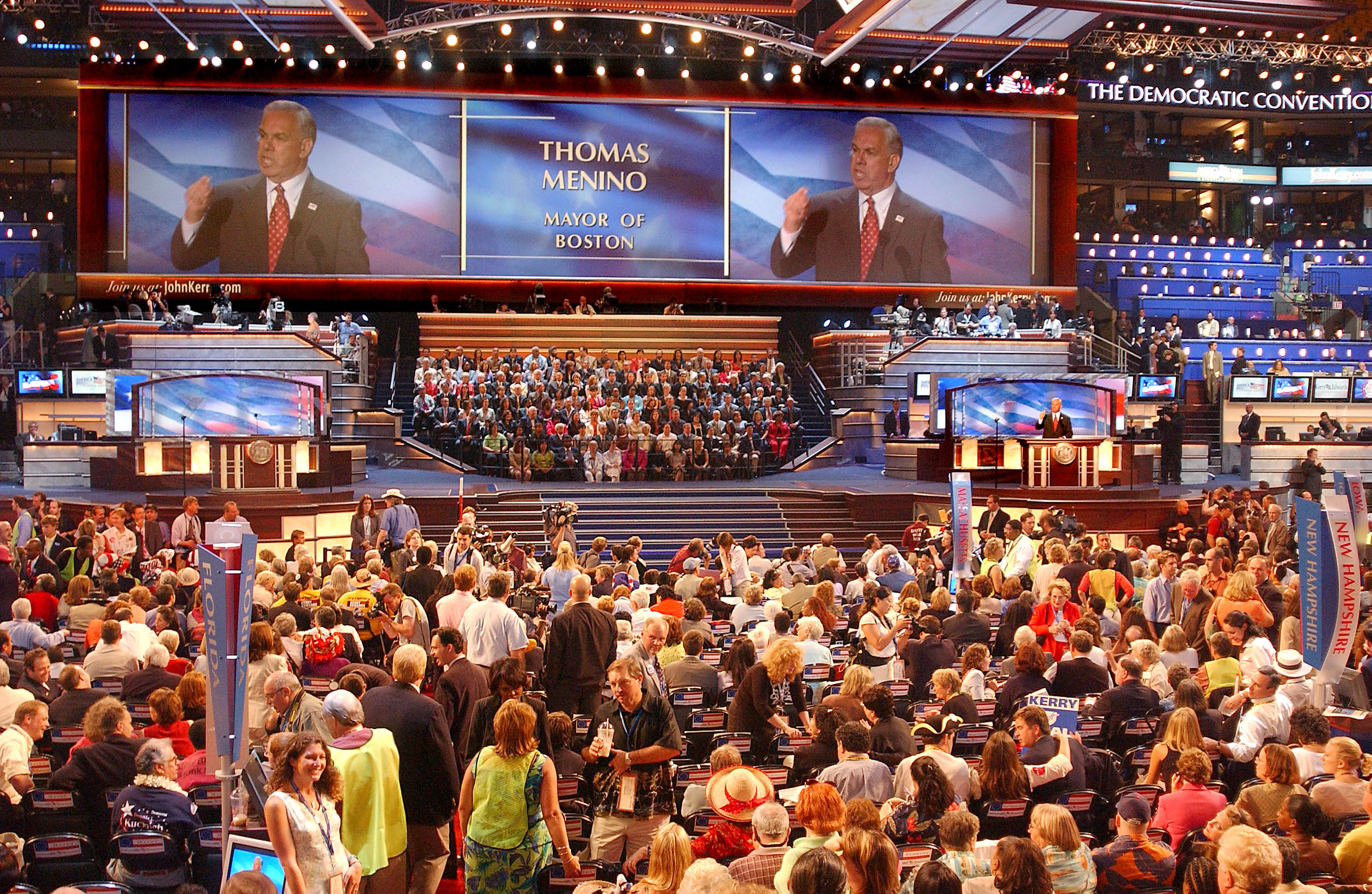
Boston mayor Thomas Menino welcomes delegates to the 2004 convention

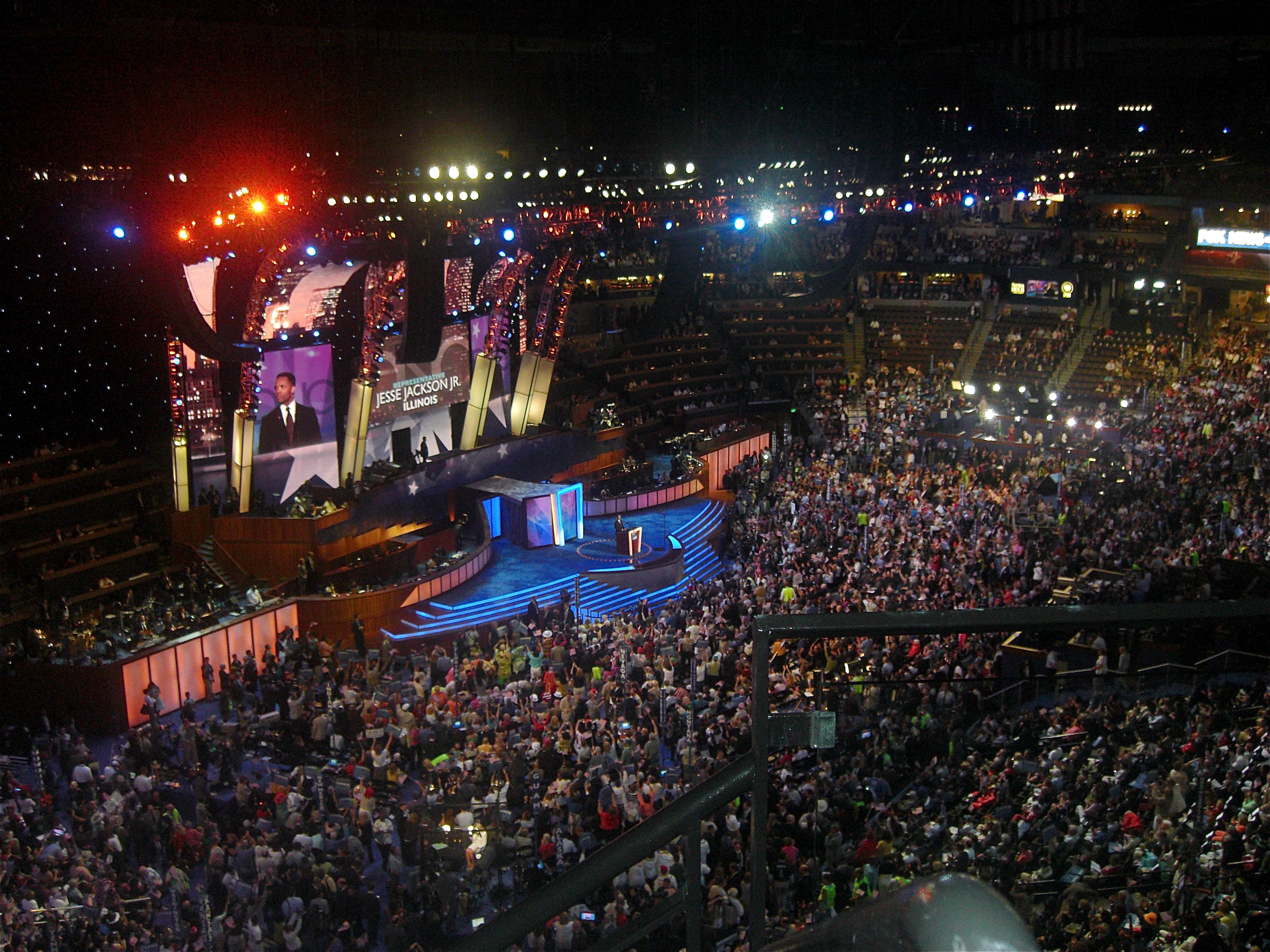
Floor of the 2008 convention

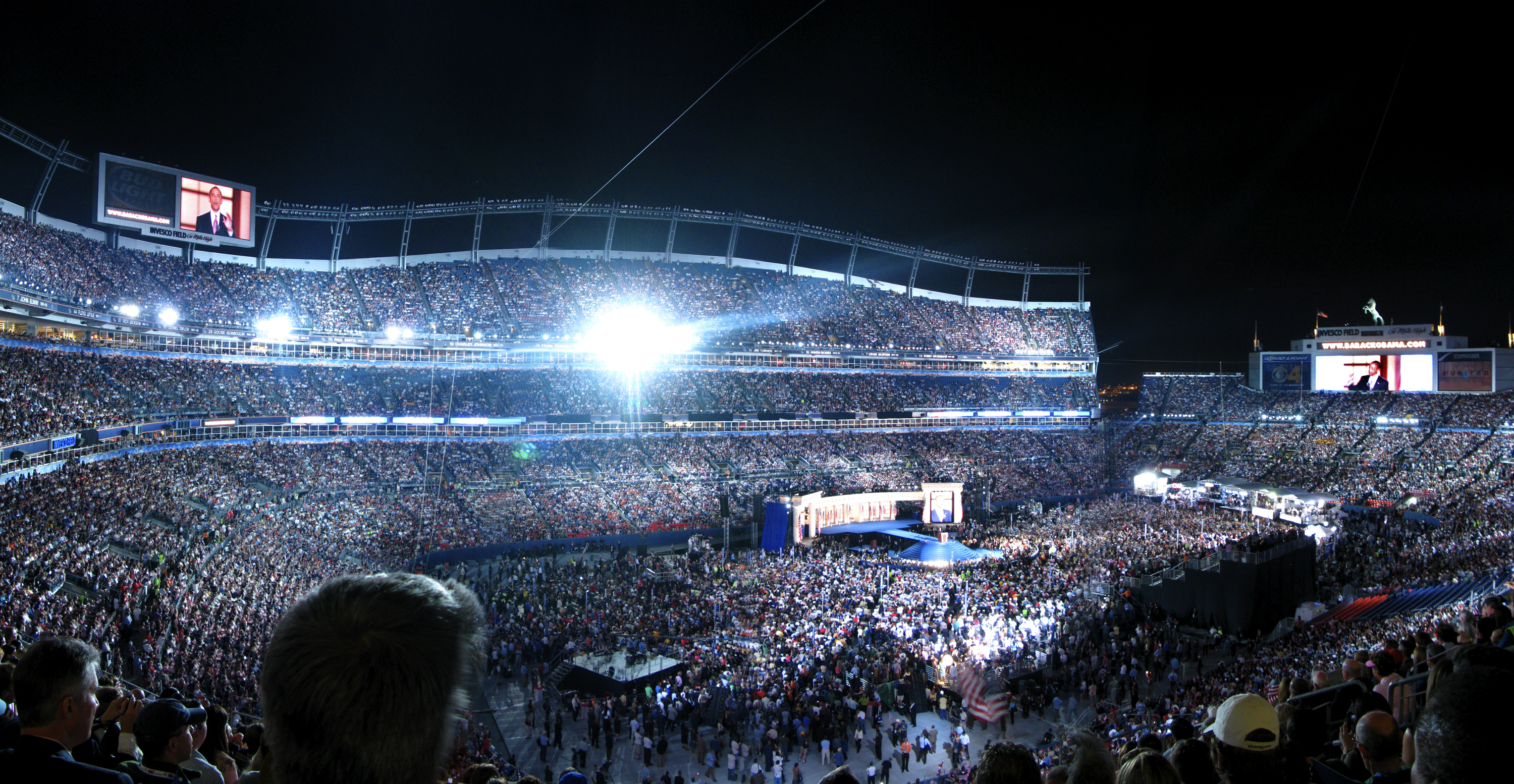
Invesco Field, site of Barack Obama's 2008 acceptance speech

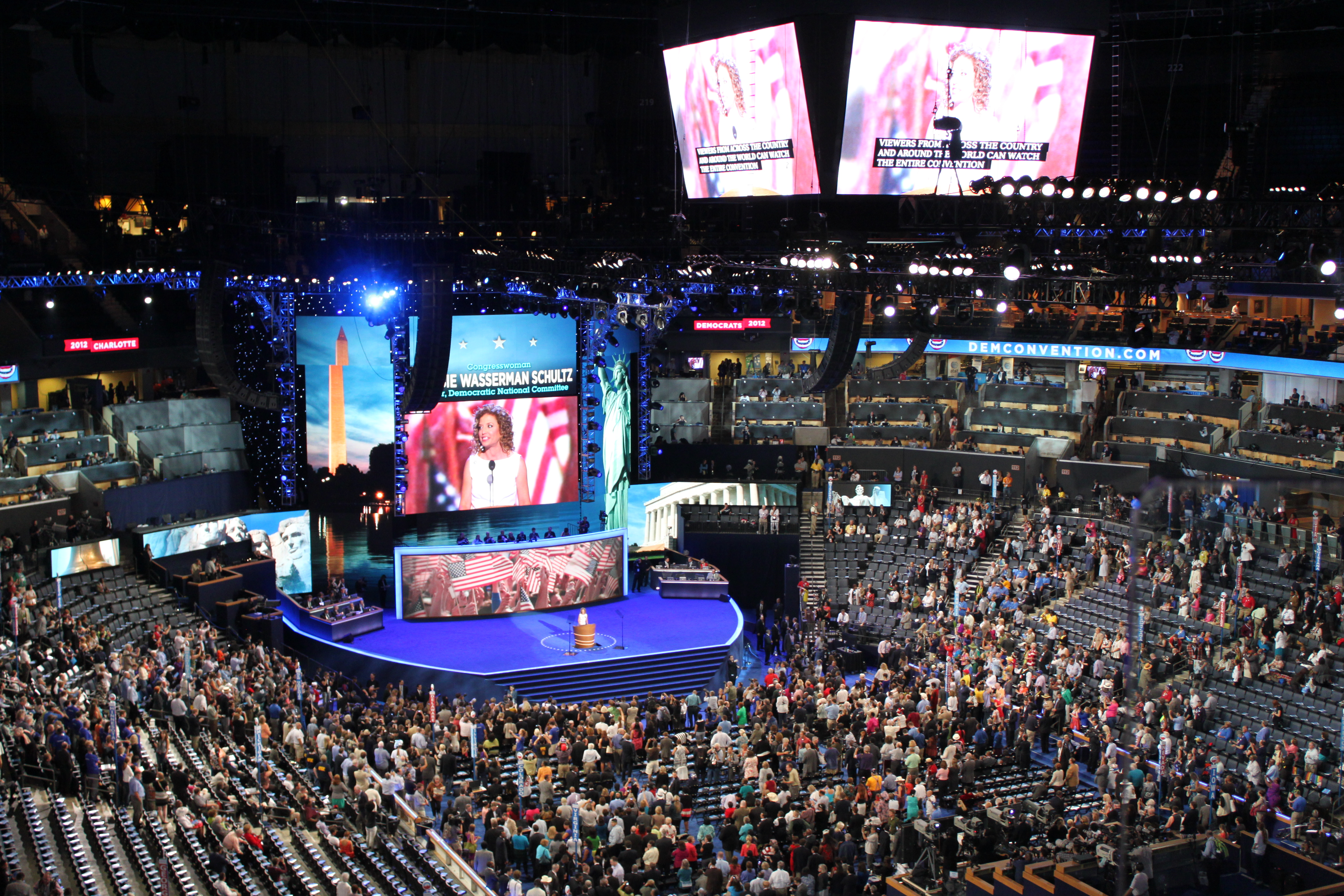
Floor of the 2012 convention

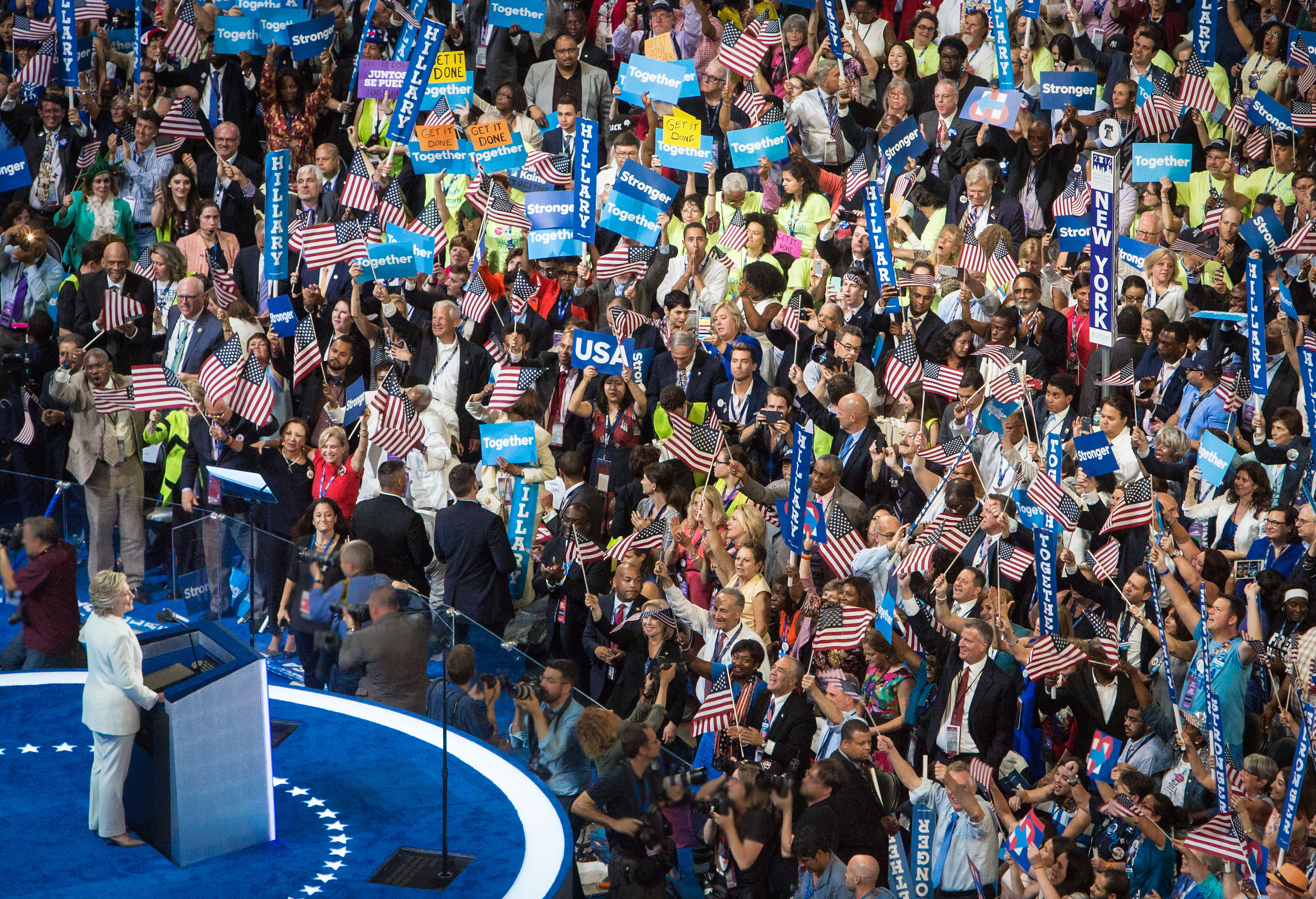
Nominee Hillary Clinton speaks at the 2016 convention

== See also ==
Democratic Party

- Democratic Party (United States) organizations
- Factions in the Democratic Party (United States)
- History of the Democratic Party (United States)
- Political positions of the Democratic Party (United States)
- List of state parties of the Democratic Party (United States)
- List of United States Democratic Party presidential candidates
- List of United States Democratic Party presidential tickets

United States politics

- List of presidential nominating conventions in the United States
- List of Republican National Conventions
- List of Whig National Conventions
- United States presidential election
- United States presidential primary
