= List of state parties of the Democratic Party (United States) =

This is a list of official state and territorial party organizations of the Democratic Party of the United States.

== State and territorial organizations ==
Democratic majority

State/Territorial Party	Chair	Start	Elected Executive Offices	Upper House Seats	Lower House Seats	Website
Democratic National Committee	Ken Martin	February 1, 2025	0 / 2	45 / 100 (+2 Independents in caucus)	Voting members: 215 / 435; Non–voting members: 3 / 6	
Alabama Democratic Party	Bobby Singleton	August 8, 2026	0 / 10	8 / 35	28 / 105	
Alaska Democratic Party	Eric Croft	February 10, 2025	0 / 2	9 / 20 (+8 Republicans in grand coalition)	13 / 40 (+4 Independents and 1 Republicans in caucus, –2 Caucusing with the Republicans)	
Arizona Democratic Party	Charlene Fernandez	September 16, 2025	3 / 11	14 / 30	29 / 60	
Democratic Party of Arkansas	Marcus Jones	August 16, 2025	0 / 7	6 / 35	18 / 100	
California Democratic Party	Rusty Hicks	June 1, 2019	8 / 8	30 / 40	60 / 80	
Colorado Democratic Party	Shad Murib	April 1, 2023	5 / 5	23 / 35	43 / 65	
Democratic Party of Connecticut	Roberto Alves	January 22, 2025	6 / 6	25 / 36	102 / 151	
Delaware Democratic Party	Evelyn Brady	November 15, 2020; Acting: November 15, 2020 – June 12, 2021	6 / 6	15 / 21	26 / 41	
Florida Democratic Party	Nikki Fried	February 25, 2023	0 / 6	12 / 40	35 / 120	
Democratic Party of Georgia	Charlie Bailey	May 3, 2025	2 / 13	23 / 56	79 / 180	
Democratic Party of Hawaiʻi	Makai Freitas	May 30, 2026	2 / 2	22 / 25	41 / 51	
Idaho Democratic Party	Lauren Necochea	March 12, 2022	0 / 7	7 / 35	11 / 70	
Democratic Party of Illinois	Lisa Hernandez	July 30, 2022	6 / 6	40 / 59	78 / 118	
Indiana Democratic Party	Karen Tallian	March 15, 2025	0 / 7	10 / 50	30 / 100	
Iowa Democratic Party	Rita Hart	January 29, 2023	1 / 7	18 / 50	40 / 100	
Kansas Democratic Party	Jeanna Repass	February 25, 2023	2 / 6	11 / 40	40 / 125	
Kentucky Democratic Party	Colmon Elridge	November 16, 2020	2 / 7	8 / 38	25 / 100	
Louisiana Democratic Party	Randal Gaines	April 13, 2024	0 / 7	12 / 39	32 / 105 (+3 Independents in caucus)	
Maine Democratic Party	Charlie Dingman	January 27, 2025	4 / 4	22 / 35	80 / 151	
Maryland Democratic Party	Steuart Pittman	June 27, 2025	4 / 4	34 / 47	102 / 141	
Massachusetts Democratic Party	Steve Kerrigan	April 24, 2023	6 / 6	37 / 40	134 / 160	
Michigan Democratic Party	Curtis Hertel	February 22, 2025	4 / 4	20 / 38	56 / 110	
Minnesota Democratic–Farmer–Labor Party	Richard Carlbom	March 29, 2025	5 / 5	34 / 67	66 / 134 +1 vacant	
Mississippi Democratic Party	Cheikh Taylor	July 6, 2023	0 / 8	14 / 52	43 / 122	
Missouri Democratic Party	Russ Carnahan	March 18, 2023	0 / 6	10 / 34	52 / 163	
Montana Democratic Party	Bruce Knutson	October 12, 2026	0 / 6	18 / 50	33 / 100	
Nebraska Democratic Party	Jane Kleeb	December 17, 2016	0 / 6	Nebraska Legislature; 17 / 49 (Officially nonpartisan)		
Nevada Democratic Party	Daniele Monroe-Moreno	March 4, 2023	3 / 6	12 / 21	26 / 42	
New Hampshire Democratic Party	Ray Buckley	March 25, 2007	0 / 1	10 / 24	199 / 400	
New Jersey Democratic State Committee	LeRoy Jones Jr.	June 17, 2021	2 / 2	25 / 40	52 / 80	
Democratic Party of New Mexico	Sara Attleson	April 26, 2025	7 / 7	27 / 42	45 / 70	
New York State Democratic Party	Jay Jacobs	January 15, 2019	4 / 4	42 / 63	102 / 150	
North Carolina Democratic Party	Anderson Clayton	February 11, 2023	5 / 10	22 / 50	51 / 120	
North Dakota Democratic–Nonpartisan League Party	Adam Goldwyn	April 24, 2023	0 / 13	7 / 47	14 / 94	
Ohio Democratic Party	Kathleen Clyde	June 10, 2025	0 / 6	8 / 33	35 / 99	
Oklahoma Democratic Party	Erin Brewer	December 8, 2025	0 / 11	8 / 48	20 / 101	
Democratic Party of Oregon	Nathan Soltz	March 16, 2025	5 / 5	18 / 30	37 / 60	
Pennsylvania Democratic Party	Eugene DePasquale	September 6, 2025	2 / 5	22 / 50	102 / 203	
Rhode Island Democratic Party	Liz Beretta-Perik	November 15, 2023	5 / 5	32 / 38	65 / 75	
South Carolina Democratic Party	Christale Spain	April 29, 2023	1 / 8	16 / 46	43 / 124	
South Dakota Democratic Party	Shane Merrill	August 19, 2023; Acting: August 19, 2023 – September 16, 2023	0 / 10	3 / 35	8 / 70	
Tennessee Democratic Party	Rachel Campbell	January 25, 2025	0 / 1	6 / 33	26 / 99	
Texas Democratic Party	Kendall Scudder	March 29, 2025	0 / 9	13 / 31	66 / 150	
Utah Democratic Party	Brian King	May 31, 2025	0 / 5	6 / 29	17 / 75	
Vermont Democratic Party	Lachlan Francis	November 15, 2025	4 / 6	21 / 30 (+2 Progressives)	92 / 150 (+7 Progressives and 5 independents in caucus)	
Democratic Party of Virginia	Lamont Bagby	March 22, 2025	3 / 3	22 / 40	64 / 100	
Washington State Democratic Party	Shasti Conrad	January 28, 2023	9 / 9	29 / 49	58 / 95	
West Virginia Democratic Party	Mike Pushkin	June 18, 2022	0 / 6	3 / 34	11 / 100	
Democratic Party of Wisconsin	Devin Remiker	July 1, 2025	4 / 5	15 / 33	45 / 99	
Wyoming Democratic Party	Lucas Fralick	June 1, 2025	0 / 5	2 / 30	7 / 60	
American Samoa Democratic Party	Ti’a Reid	October 22, 2020	2 / 2	0 / 18 (Officially nonpartisan)	0 / 21 (Officially nonpartisan)	
District of Columbia Democratic State Committee	Chioma Iwuoha	September 10, 2026	2 / 2	D.C. Council; 11 / 13		
Democratic Party of Guam	Tony Chargualaf	February 8, 2025	3 / 4	Guam Legislature; 8 / 15		
Democratic Party of the Northern Mariana Islands	Annie Pickelsimer	May 3, 2025	1 / 3	2 / 9 (+3 independents in caucus)	4 / 20 (+12 independents in caucus)	
Puerto Rico Democratic Party	Luis Dávila Pernas	March 16, 2024	1 / 1	0 / 30	0 / 51	
Democratic Party of the Virgin Islands	Carol Burke	October 12, 2024	2 / 2	Legislature of the Virgin Islands; 9 / 15		
Democrats Abroad	Martha McDevitt-Pugh	June 11, 2023	—N/a	—N/a	—N/a	

== See also ==
Democratic Party

- Democratic Party (United States) organizations

United States politics

- List of state parties of the Republican Party (United States)
- List of state parties of the Libertarian Party (United States)
