= Galeai Moaaliitele Tuufuli =

American Samoan politician

American Samoa Commissioner of Public Safety
- Prime Minister: 1992
- Governor: A. P. Lutali; Peter Tali Coleman

Member of the American Samoa Senate from the Manu'a 1 district
- In office 3 January 2008 – 24 October 2018

Personal details
- Born: 1937 Fagatogo
- Died: 24 October 2018 (aged 80–81) Hayward, California
- Party: American Samoa Democratic Party

Galeai Moaaliitele Tuufuli (c. 1937 – October 24, 2018) was an American Samoan politician.

== Biography ==
Tuufuli taught at the American Samoa Community College from 1976 to 1982. He also served as the police commissioner from 1985 to 1992. Tuufuli was a paramount chief and served in the American Samoa Senate for the Manu'a District, American Samoa in the late 1990's. He was re-elected to the Senate in 2008, and re-elected in December 2012, for the 2013-2017 term. He was re-elected in November 2016 for the 2017-2021 term.

In 2017 he was given an award as the longest-serving government employee. He died at St. Rose Hospital in Hayward, California at age 81.

== Legacy ==
The Afioga Galeai Moaaliitele Tuufuli Central Police Station in Pago Pago is named in his honour.
