= Democratic Party (United States) organizations =

List of organizations associated with the Democratic Party

This is an incomplete list of organizations associated with the Democratic Party of the United States.

== Fundraising and coordination ==
- Democratic Association of Secretaries of State
- Democratic Attorneys General Association
- Democratic Congressional Campaign Committee
- Democratic Governors Association
- Democratic Legislative Campaign Committee
- Democratic Municipal Officials
- Democratic National Committee
- Democratic Senatorial Campaign Committee
- Democrats Abroad
- National Conference of Democratic Mayors
- National Democratic County Officials
- National Democratic Redistricting Committee

== Constituency groups ==
- College Democrats
- College Democrats of America
- Democratic Majority for Israel
- DNC Women
- High School Democrats of America
- Jewish Democratic Council of America
- National Federation of Democratic Women
- Stonewall Democrats (LGBT Democrats)
- Young Democrats of America

== Ideological ==
- ActBlue
- America Votes
- Blue Collar Caucus
- Blue Dog Coalition
- Center for American Progress
- Congressional Progressive Caucus
- Democrats for Life of America
- EMILY's List
- Indivisible
- MoveOn
- New Democrat Coalition
- Progressive Change Campaign Committee
- Progressive Democrats of America
- Progressive Policy Institute

== See also ==
- List of state parties of the Democratic Party (United States)
