= Patrick Reid (American Samoa) =

American Samoa politician

Ti’a Reid
- Reid in 2015

Chair of the American Samoa Democratic Party
- Incumbent
- Assumed office October 22, 2020
- Preceded by: Taimalelagi Tuia (acting)

Personal details
- Party: Democratic
- Education: University of Hawaiʻi at Mānoa (BA); American University (MPA)

Patrick "Ti’a" Reid is an American Samoan Party leader serving as Chairman of the Democratic Party of American Samoa and an advisor for Governor Lemanu Peleti Mauga.

== Early life and education ==
Reid holds a Bachelor of Arts in political science from the University of Hawaiʻi at Mānoa and a Master of Public Policy and Administration (MPAP) from American University in Washington, D.C. He is a member of The Church of Jesus Christ of Latter-day Saints.

He has led and co-organized various initiatives, including coastal clean-ups, wheelchair distributions for the disabled, and clothing and food drives. He has been a co-chair of the Black Lives Matter movement in American Samoa. Reid holds leadership roles in several community organizations, including serving on the Executive Boards of the Leone High School Alumni Association and the American Samoa Tennis Association, where he has been the Secretary since 2023. He is also the President of Pacific Global Citizen, a non-profit organization founded as a graduate student that organizes volunteer community service projects.

== Career ==
Reid has been actively involved in the American Samoa Democratic Party since 2016. He was the first American Samoan to intern at the Democratic National Headquarters in Washington D.C. in 2009. He has been an American Samoa delegate for Barack Obama in 2012, Hillary Clinton in 2016, Joe Biden in 2020, and a super delegate for Kamala Harris in 2024. In 2020, Reid was the State Director for Michael Bloomberg’s presidential campaign in American Samoa.

He was appointed as the Public Policy Advisor under the Lemanu-Talauega administration in January 2021. In this capacity, Reid manages projects in collaboration with various executive branch departments and agencies. His policy portfolio includes critical issues such as COVID-19 response, healthcare workforce, maternal and child health, climate change and resilience, substance abuse and mental health, and veterans' affairs. Before his current role, Reid served as the Program Coordinator for the American Samoa Department of Commerce from 2017 to 2020, where he was involved in economic development projects and community initiatives. He has also held positions within the Legislature of American Samoa and the State of Hawaii Department of Education.

In 2023, Reid was selected as one of 100 emerging leaders in the United States to participate in the Obama Foundation’s inaugural Leaders USA program. This six-month virtual program is designed to support and connect emerging leaders through a leadership framework inspired by the ideals of President Barack Obama.

In July 2024, Reid, as Chairman of the American Samoa Democratic Party, joined other Democratic leaders in endorsing Vice President Kamala Harris for the 2024 presidential nomination.

Party political offices
Preceded by Taimalelagi Tuia; Acting	Chair of the American Samoa Democratic Party; 2020–present	Incumbent
