= American Samoa Democratic Party =

American Samoa affiliate of the Democratic Party

American Samoa Democratic Party Vaega Faaupufai Temokalasi o Amerika Sāmoa
- Chairman: Patrick Ti’a Reid
- Vice Chairman: Petti Matila
- Secretary: Renee Togafau Mata’utia
- National Committeewoman: Sandra King-Young
- National Committeeman: Andrew Berquist
- Treasurer: Justin Tuiasosopo
- Founder: A. P. Lutali
- Founded: 1976
- Headquarters: P.O. Box 1281, Pago Pago, AS 96799
- National affiliation: Democratic Party
- Colors: Blue
- Seat in the U.S. House of Representatives: 0 / 1
- Seats in the American Samoa Senate: 1 / 18
- Seats in the American Samoa House of Representatives: 0 / 20

Election symbol

Website
- asdems.com

American Samoa Democratic Party is the American Samoa affiliate of the U.S. Democratic Party. It is based in the territorial capital of Pago Pago.

== History ==
The Democratic Party of American Samoa (DPAS) was established in 1976 as a response to the longstanding dominance of the American Samoa Party (ASP), which had been the primary political force in the territory since its formation in 1946. The DPAS was created to offer an alternative political voice, particularly for those who felt underserved by the ASP's policies. The party's early leadership comprised community activists, traditional chiefs, and intellectuals who were committed to preserving the Samoan language, culture, and traditional practices.

Initially, the DPAS garnered significant support from the younger generation, who were increasingly disillusioned with the status quo maintained by the ASP. This support translated into electoral success, and the party soon saw several of its leaders, including notable figures such as Tuiasosopo Mariota Ta’ase and party founder A. P. Lutali, serve in key positions.

The American Samoa Democratic Party became affiliated with the Democratic National Committee (DNC) in 1984 and entered the arena of national party politics by now participating in the selection of the Democratic presidential candidate at the national conventions.

Today, the DPAS remains the primary opposition political party in American Samoa, with the smaller Republican Party of American Samoa serving as its opponent. Both parties advocate for greater economic development, Americanization, and cultural preservation, but they diverge in their governance strategies. The DPAS continues to focus on preserving Samoan culture, language, and traditions while promoting self-determination and autonomy. The party's support base is strong among traditional chiefs, community activists, intellectuals, and the younger demographic. In contrast, the Republican Party of American Samoa draws its primary support from conservative religious groups and the business community.

== Party officials ==
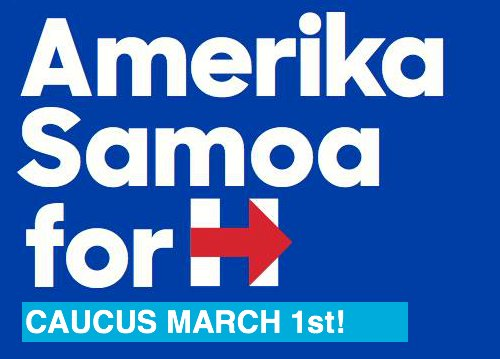
Hillary Clinton won the territory's 2016 Democratic caucuses.

Election took place on October 22, 2020.

Name	Position
Patrick Ti’a Reid	Chairman
Petti Matila	Vice-chairwoman
Renee Togafau Mata’utia	Secretary
Justin Tuiasosopo	Treasurer
Andrew Berquist	National Committeeman
Sandra King-Young	National Committeewoman

== Recent caucuses ==
=== 2024 Democratic presidential caucuses ===
Biden unexpectedly lost the popular vote to lesser-known candidate Jason Palmer, making Biden the first incumbent president to lose a contested presidential primary since Jimmy Carter lost 12 primaries to Ted Kennedy in 1980. Palmer had three campaign staffers on the island and held several virtual events prior to the caucuses. A Biden campaign official dismissed the loss as "silly news." It was initially reported by the American Samoa Democratic Party that Palmer won four delegates, while Joe Biden won two. The same day, the delegate count was corrected, with Palmer and Biden winning three delegates each.

2024 American Samoa Democratic pres. caucus
Candidate	Votes	%	Delegates
Jason Palmer	51	56.04	3
Joe Biden (incumbent)	40	43.96	3
Dean Phillips	0	0.00	0
Total	91	100%	6

=== 2020 Democratic presidential caucuses ===
During the 2020 presidential caucuses for American Samoa, which took place on March 3, 2020, almost half of the votes (49.86%) went to candidate Mike Bloomberg, 29.34% to Tulsi Gabbard, 10.54% to Bernie Sanders, 8.83% to Joe Biden, and 1.42% to Elizabeth Warren.

2020 American Samoa Democratic caucuses
Candidate	Votes	%	Delegates
Michael Bloomberg	175	49.86	4
Tulsi Gabbard	103	29.34	2
Bernie Sanders	37	10.54	
Joe Biden	31	8.83	
Elizabeth Warren	5	1.42	
Uncommitted	0	0.00	
Total	351	100%	6

Bloomberg dropped out of the race following the caucus, causing the party to reassess who would receive its support.

== See also ==
- List of political parties in American Samoa
- American Samoa Democrats
