= Donald Rumsfeld =

American politician and diplomat (1932–2021)

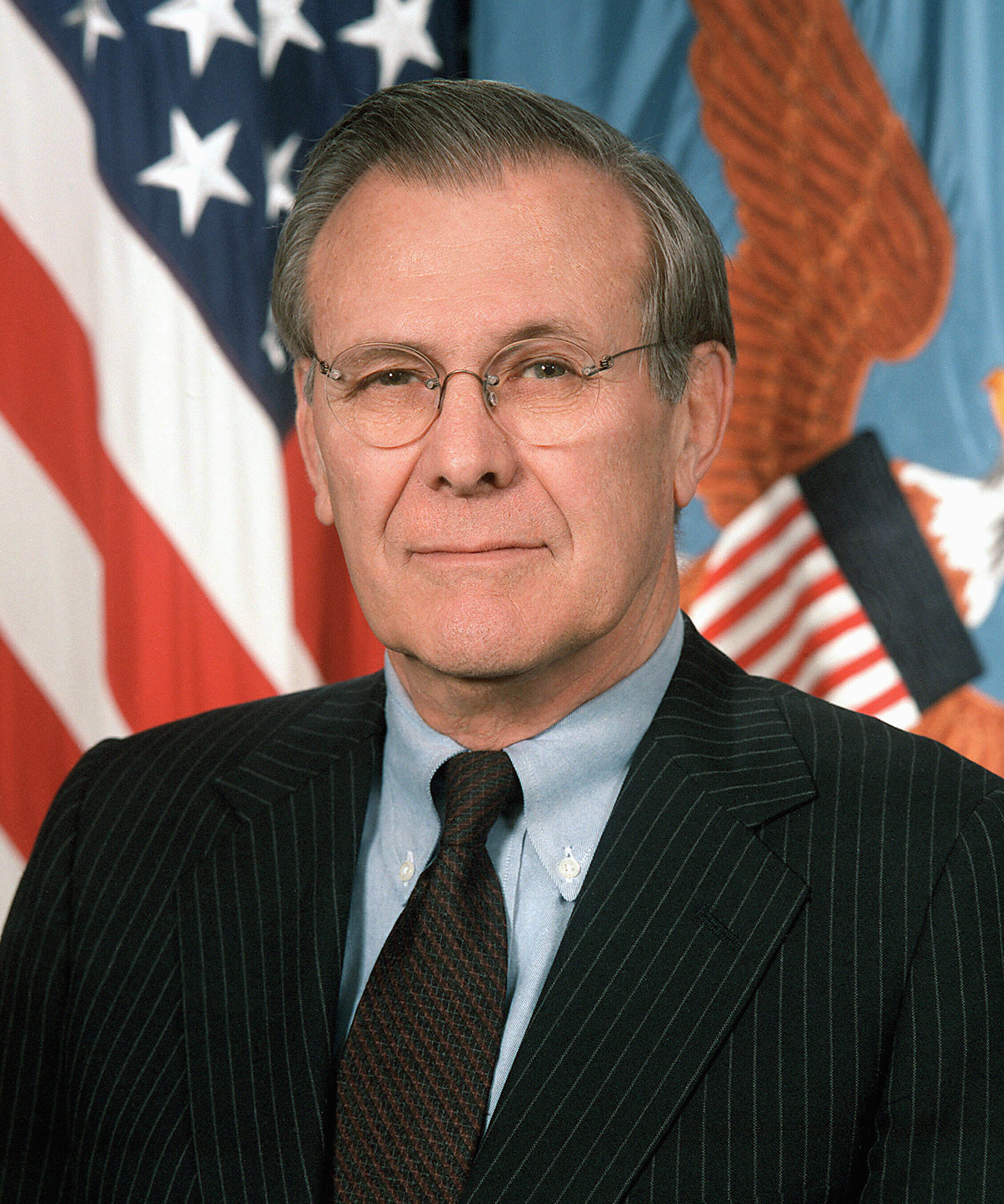
- Official portrait, 2001

13th & 21st United States Secretary of Defense
- In office January 20, 2001 – December 18, 2006
- President: George W. Bush
- Deputy: Rudy de Leon; Paul Wolfowitz; Gordon England
- Preceded by: William Cohen
- Succeeded by: Robert Gates
- In office November 20, 1975 – January 20, 1977
- President: Gerald Ford
- Deputy: Bill Clements
- Preceded by: James Schlesinger
- Succeeded by: Harold Brown

United States Special Envoy to the Middle East
- In office November 3, 1983 – May 15, 1984
- President: Ronald Reagan
- Preceded by: Robert McFarlane
- Succeeded by: Position abolished

6th White House Chief of Staff
- In office September 21, 1974 – November 20, 1975
- President: Gerald Ford
- Deputy: Dick Cheney
- Preceded by: Alexander Haig
- Succeeded by: Dick Cheney
Additional positions
9th United States Ambassador to NATO
In office February 2, 1973 – September 21, 1974
President	Richard Nixon; Gerald Ford
Preceded by	David M. Kennedy
Succeeded by	David K. E. Bruce
Director of the Cost of Living Council
In office October 15, 1971 – February 2, 1973
President	Richard Nixon
Preceded by	Position established
Succeeded by	Position abolished
Counselor to the President
In office December 11, 1970 – October 15, 1971 Serving with Robert Finch
President	Richard Nixon
Preceded by	Bryce Harlow; Daniel Patrick Moynihan
Succeeded by	Robert Finch
3rd Director of the Office of Economic Opportunity
In office May 27, 1969 – December 11, 1970
President	Richard Nixon
Preceded by	Bertrand Harding
Succeeded by	Frank Carlucci

Member of the U.S. House of Representatives from Illinois's 13th district
- In office January 3, 1963 – May 25, 1969
- Preceded by: Marguerite Church
- Succeeded by: Phil Crane

Personal details
- Born: Donald Henry Rumsfeld; July 9, 1932 Chicago, Illinois, U.S.
- Died: June 29, 2021 (aged 88) Taos, New Mexico, U.S.
- Resting place: Arlington National Cemetery
- Party: Republican
- Spouse: Joyce Pierson (m. 1954)
- Children: 3
- Education: Princeton University (BA); Case Western Reserve University (attended); Georgetown University (attended)
- Website: Official website
- Nickname: "Rummy"

Military service
- Allegiance: United States
- Branch/service: United States Navy; Naval Reserve; Individual Ready Reserve
- Years of service: 1954–1957 (active); 1957–1975 (reserve); 1975–1989 (ready reserve)
- Rank: Captain
- Rumsfeld's voice Rumsfeld at the first Pentagon press conference after the September 11 attacks. Recorded September 11, 2001

Donald Henry Rumsfeld (July 9, 1932 – June 29, 2021) was an American politician, businessman, naval officer, and diplomat who served as the 13th United States secretary of defense from 1975 to 1977 under President Gerald Ford, and again as the 21st secretary of defense from 2001 to 2006 under President George W. Bush. He was both the youngest and the oldest secretary of defense. Additionally, Rumsfeld was a four-term U.S. Congressman from Illinois (1963–1969), director of the Office of Economic Opportunity (1969–1970), counselor to the president (1969–1973), the U.S. Representative to NATO (1973–1974), and the White House chief of staff (1974–1975). Between his terms as secretary of defense, he was the CEO and chairman of several companies.

Born in Chicago, Rumsfeld attended Princeton University, graduating in 1954 with a degree in political science. After serving in the Navy for three years, he mounted a campaign for Congress in Illinois's 13th Congressional District, winning in 1962 at the age of 30. Rumsfeld accepted an appointment by President Richard Nixon to head the Office of Economic Opportunity in 1969; appointed counsellor by Nixon and entitled to Cabinet-level status, he also headed up the Economic Stabilization Program before being appointed ambassador to NATO. Called back to Washington in August 1974, Rumsfeld was appointed chief of staff by President Ford. Rumsfeld recruited a young one-time staffer of his, Dick Cheney, to succeed him when Ford nominated him to be secretary of defense in 1975. When Ford lost the 1976 election, Rumsfeld returned to private business and financial life, and was named president and CEO of the pharmaceutical corporation G. D. Searle & Company. He was later named CEO of General Instrument from 1990 to 1993 and chairman of Gilead Sciences from 1997 to 2001.

Rumsfeld was appointed secretary of defense for a second time in January 2001 by President George W. Bush. As secretary of defense, Rumsfeld played a central role in the 2001 United States invasion of Afghanistan and 2003 invasion of Iraq. Before and during the Iraq War, he claimed that Iraq had an active weapons of mass destruction program; no stockpiles were ever found. A Pentagon Inspector General report found that Rumsfeld's top policy aide "developed, produced, and then disseminated alternative intelligence assessments on the Iraq and al-Qaeda relationship, which included some conclusions that were inconsistent with the consensus of the Intelligence Community, to senior decision-makers". Rumsfeld's tenure was controversial for its use of torture and the Abu Ghraib torture and prisoner abuse scandal. Rumsfeld gradually lost political support and resigned in late 2006. In his retirement years, he published an autobiography, Known and Unknown: A Memoir, as well as Rumsfeld's Rules: Leadership Lessons in Business, Politics, War, and Life.

== Early life and education ==
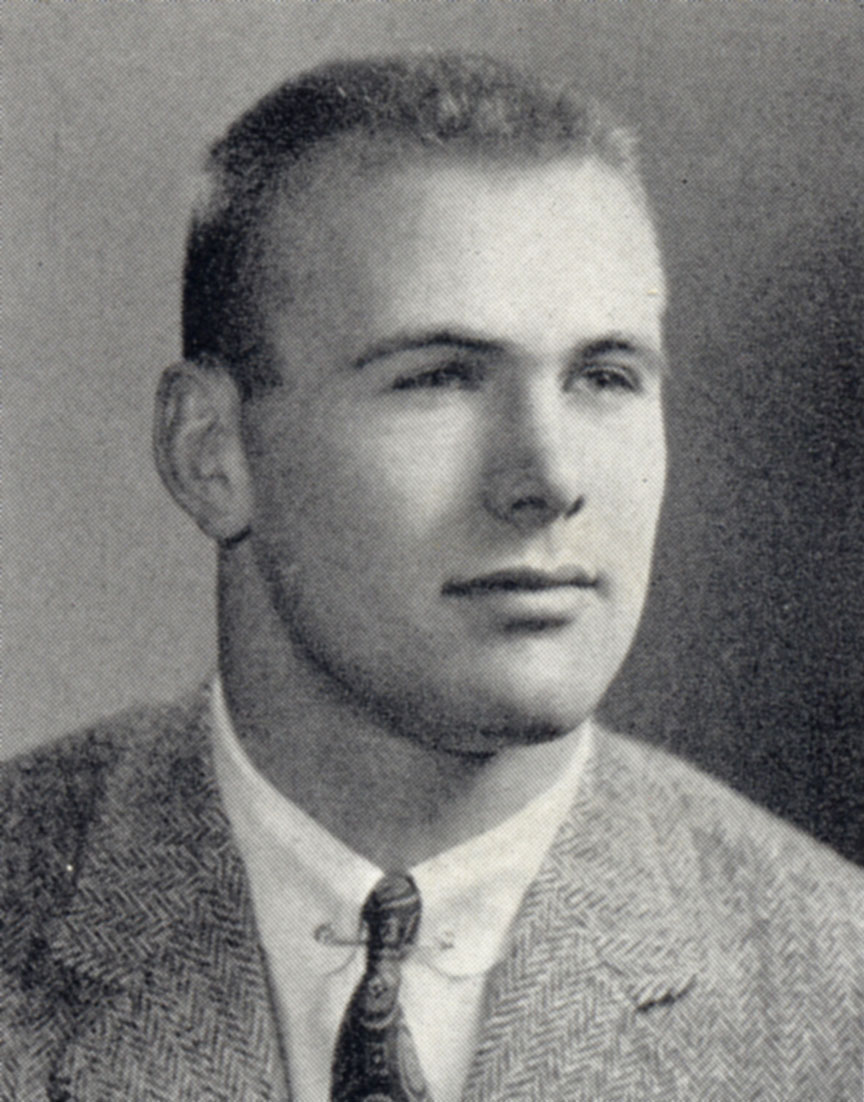
Rumsfeld's 1954 yearbook portrait from Princeton

Donald Henry Rumsfeld was born at St. Luke's Hospital on July 9, 1932, in Chicago, Illinois. He was the son of Jeannette Kearsley (née Husted) and George Donald Rumsfeld. His father came from a German family that had emigrated in the 1870s from Weyhe in Lower Saxony, but young Donald was sometimes ribbed about looking like a "tough Swiss". Growing up in Winnetka, Illinois, Rumsfeld became an Eagle Scout in 1949 and was the recipient of both the Distinguished Eagle Scout Award from the Boy Scouts of America and its Silver Buffalo Award in 2006. Living in Winnetka, his family attended a Congregational church. From 1943 to 1945, Rumsfeld lived in Coronado, California, while his father was stationed on an aircraft carrier in the Pacific in World War II. He was a ranger at Philmont Scout Ranch in 1949.

Rumsfeld attended Baker Demonstration School, and later graduated from New Trier High School where he excelled academically as well as in sports. In the band, he played drums and excelled at saxophone. He attended Princeton University on academic and NROTC partial scholarships. He graduated in 1954 with an A.B. in politics after completing a senior thesis titled "The Steel Seizure Case of 1952 and Its Effects on Presidential Powers". During his time at Princeton, he was an accomplished amateur wrestler, becoming captain of the varsity wrestling team and captain of the Lightweight Football team, playing defensive back. While at Princeton he was friends with another future Secretary of Defense, Frank Carlucci.

Rumsfeld married Joyce P. Pierson on December 27, 1954. They had three children, six grandchildren, and one great-grandchild. He attended Case Western Reserve University School of Law and the Georgetown University Law Center, but did not take a degree from either institution.

=== Naval service ===
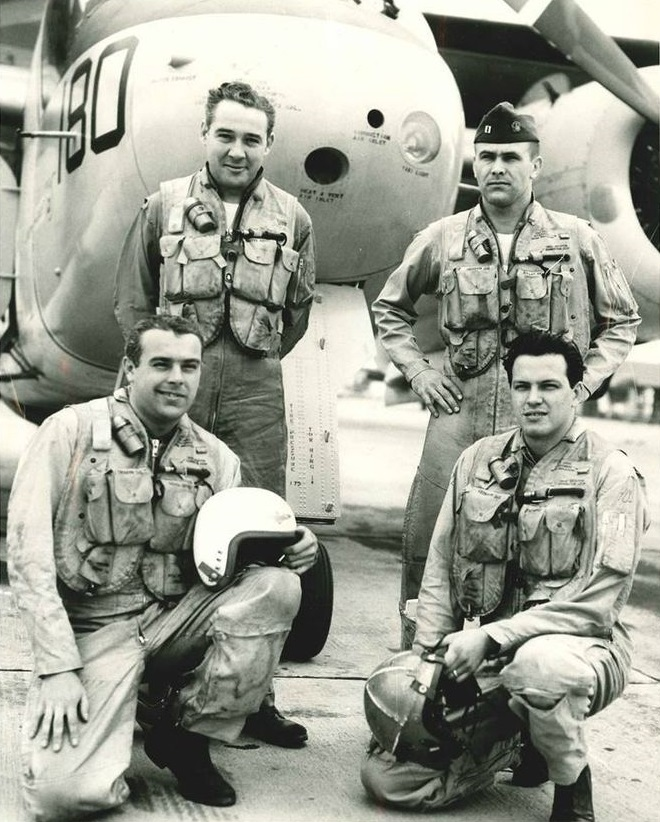
Rumsfeld (right, standing) as a Navy lieutenant in 1955

Rumsfeld served in the United States Navy from 1954 to 1957, as a naval aviator and flight instructor. His initial training was in the North American SNJ Texan basic trainer, after which he transitioned to the T-28 advanced trainer. In 1957, he transferred to the Naval Reserve and continued his naval service in flying and administrative assignments as a drilling reservist. On July 1, 1958, he was assigned to Anti-submarine Squadron 662 at Naval Air Station Anacostia in Washington, D.C., as a selective reservist. Rumsfeld was designated aircraft commander of Anti-submarine Squadron 731 on October 1, 1960, at Naval Air Station Grosse Ile, Michigan, where he flew the S2F Tracker. He transferred to the Individual Ready Reserve when he became Secretary of Defense in 1975 and retired with the rank of captain in 1989.

== Career in government (1962–1975) ==
=== Member of Congress ===
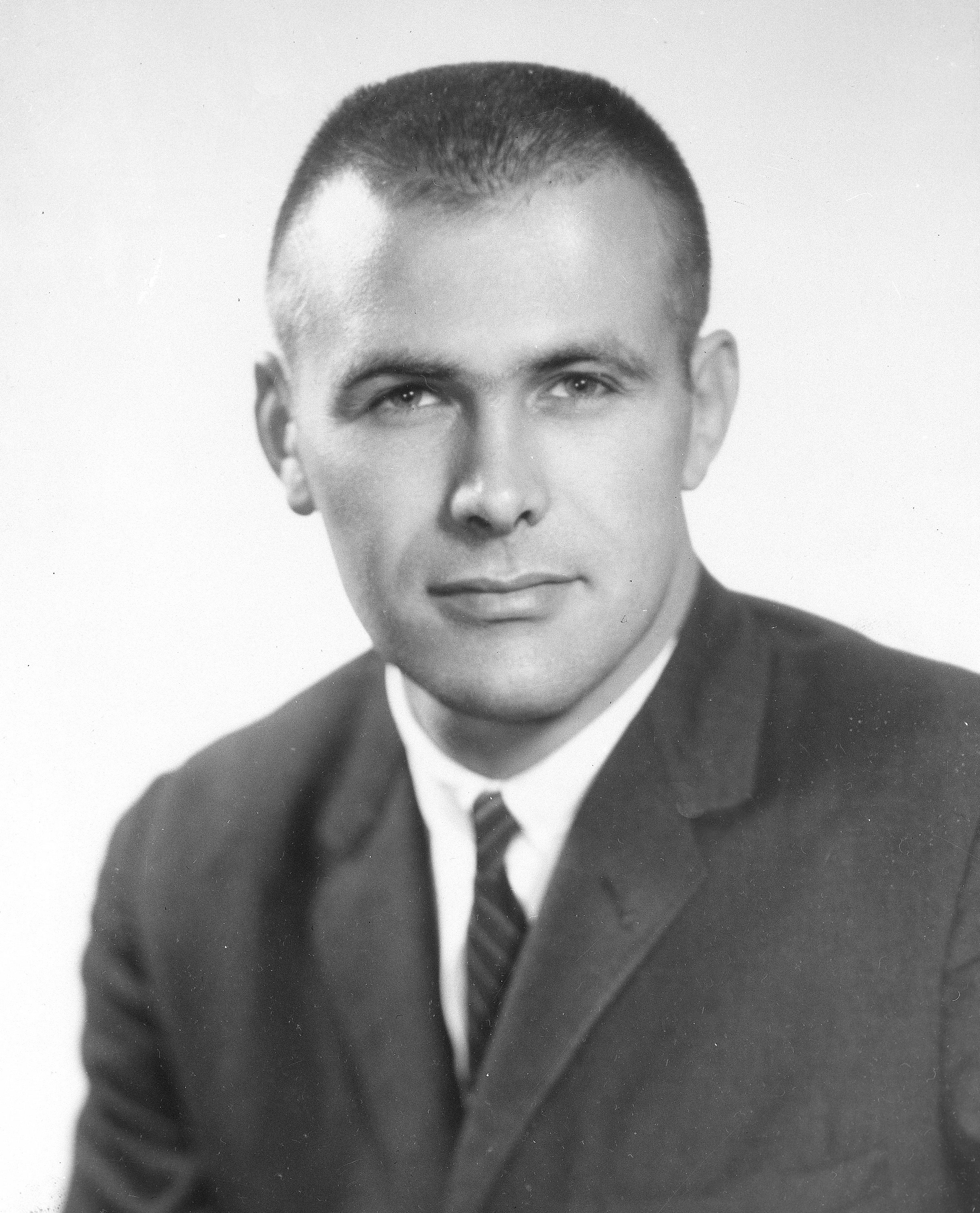
Rumsfeld during his time in Congress

In 1957, during the Dwight D. Eisenhower administration, Rumsfeld served as administrative assistant to David S. Dennison Jr., a Congressman representing the 11th district of Ohio. In 1959, he moved on to become a staff assistant to Congressman Robert P. Griffin of Michigan. Engaging in a two-year stint with an investment banking firm, A. G. Becker & Co., from 1960 to 1962, Rumsfeld then set his sights on becoming a member of Congress.

He was elected to the United States House of Representatives for Illinois's 13th congressional district in 1962, at the age of 30, and was re-elected by large majorities in 1964, 1966, and 1968. While in Congress, he served on the Joint Economic Committee, the Committee on Science and Aeronautics, and the Government Operations Committee, as well as on the Subcommittees on Military and Foreign Operations. He was also a co-founder of the Japanese-American Inter-Parliamentary Council in addition to being a leading cosponsor of the Freedom of Information Act.

In 1965, following the defeat of Barry Goldwater by Lyndon B. Johnson in the 1964 presidential election, which also led to the Republicans losing many seats in the House of Representatives, Rumsfeld proposed new leadership for the Republicans in the House, suggesting that representative Gerald Ford from Michigan's 5th congressional district was the most suited candidate to replace Charles A. Halleck as Republican leader. Rumsfeld, along with other members of the Republican caucus, then urged Ford to run for Republican leader. Ford eventually defeated Halleck and became House Minority Leader in 1965. The group of Republicans that encouraged Ford to run for the Republican leadership became known as the "Young Turks". Rumsfeld later served during Ford's presidency as his chief of staff in 1974, and was chosen by Ford to succeed James Schlesinger as United States Secretary of Defense in 1975.

During Rumsfeld's tenure as member of the U.S. House of Representatives, he voiced concerns about U.S. involvement in the Vietnam War, saying that President Johnson and his national security team were overconfident about how the war was being conducted. On one occasion, Rumsfeld joined with other members of the House and traveled to Vietnam for a fact-finding mission to see for themselves how the war was going. The trip led to Rumsfeld believing that the South Vietnamese government was much too dependent on the United States. Rumsfeld was also unsatisfied when he received a briefing about war planning from the commander of the U.S. troops in Vietnam, General William Westmoreland. The trip led Rumsfeld to cosponsor a resolution to bring the conduct of the war to the House floor for further debate and discussion about U.S. mismanagement of the war. However, under constant pressure from the Johnson administration, the Democrats, who at that time held the majority at the House of Representatives, blocked the resolution from consideration.

As a young Congressman, Rumsfeld attended seminars at the University of Chicago, an experience he credits with introducing him to the idea of an all volunteer military, and to the economist Milton Friedman and the Chicago School of Economics. He later took part in Friedman's PBS series Free to Choose.

During his tenure in the House, Rumsfeld voted in favor of the Civil Rights Acts of 1964 and 1968, and the Voting Rights Act of 1965.

=== Nixon administration ===
Rumsfeld resigned from Congress in 1969 — his fourth term — to serve in the Nixon administration in a variety of executive branch positions. Nixon appointed Rumsfeld director of the United States Office of Economic Opportunity (OEO), a position with Cabinet rank. Rumsfeld had voted against the creation of OEO when he was in Congress, and, according to his 2011 memoirs, he initially rejected Nixon's offer, citing his own inherent belief that the OEO did more harm than good, and he felt that he was not the right person for the job. After much negotiation, he accepted the OEO appointment with Nixon's "assurances that he would be ... also an assistant to the President, with Cabinet-level status and an office in the White House," which "sweetened (the OEO position) with status and responsibility".

As director, Rumsfeld sought to reorganize the Office to serve what he later described in his 2011 memoir as "a laboratory for experimental programs". Several beneficial anti-poverty programs were saved by allocating funds to them from other less-successful government programs. During this time, he hired Frank Carlucci and Dick Cheney to serve under him.

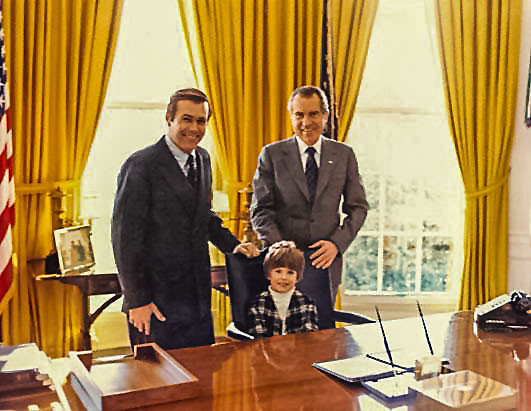
Rumsfeld with his son, Nick, in the Oval Office with President Nixon, 1973

He was the subject of one of writer Jack Anderson's columns, alleging that "anti-poverty czar" Rumsfeld had cut programs to aid the poor while spending thousands to redecorate his office. Rumsfeld dictated a four-page response to Anderson, labeling the accusations as falsehoods, and invited Anderson to tour his office. Despite the tour, Anderson did not retract his claims, and only much later admitted that his column was a mistake.

When Rumsfeld left OEO in December 1970, Nixon named him Counselor to the President, a general advisory position; in this role, he retained Cabinet status. He was given an office in the West Wing in 1969 and regularly interacted with the Nixon administration hierarchy. He was named director of the Economic Stabilization Program in 1970 as well, and later headed up the Cost of Living Council. In March 1971 Nixon was recorded saying about Rumsfeld "at least Rummy is tough enough" and "He's a ruthless little bastard. You can be sure of that."

In February 1973, Rumsfeld left Washington to serve as U.S. Ambassador to the North Atlantic Treaty Organization (NATO) in Brussels, Belgium. He served as the United States' Permanent Representative to the North Atlantic Council and the Defense Planning Committee, and the Nuclear Planning Group. In this capacity, he represented the United States in wide-ranging military and diplomatic matters, and was asked to help mediate a conflict on behalf of the United States between Cyprus and Turkey.

=== Ford administration ===
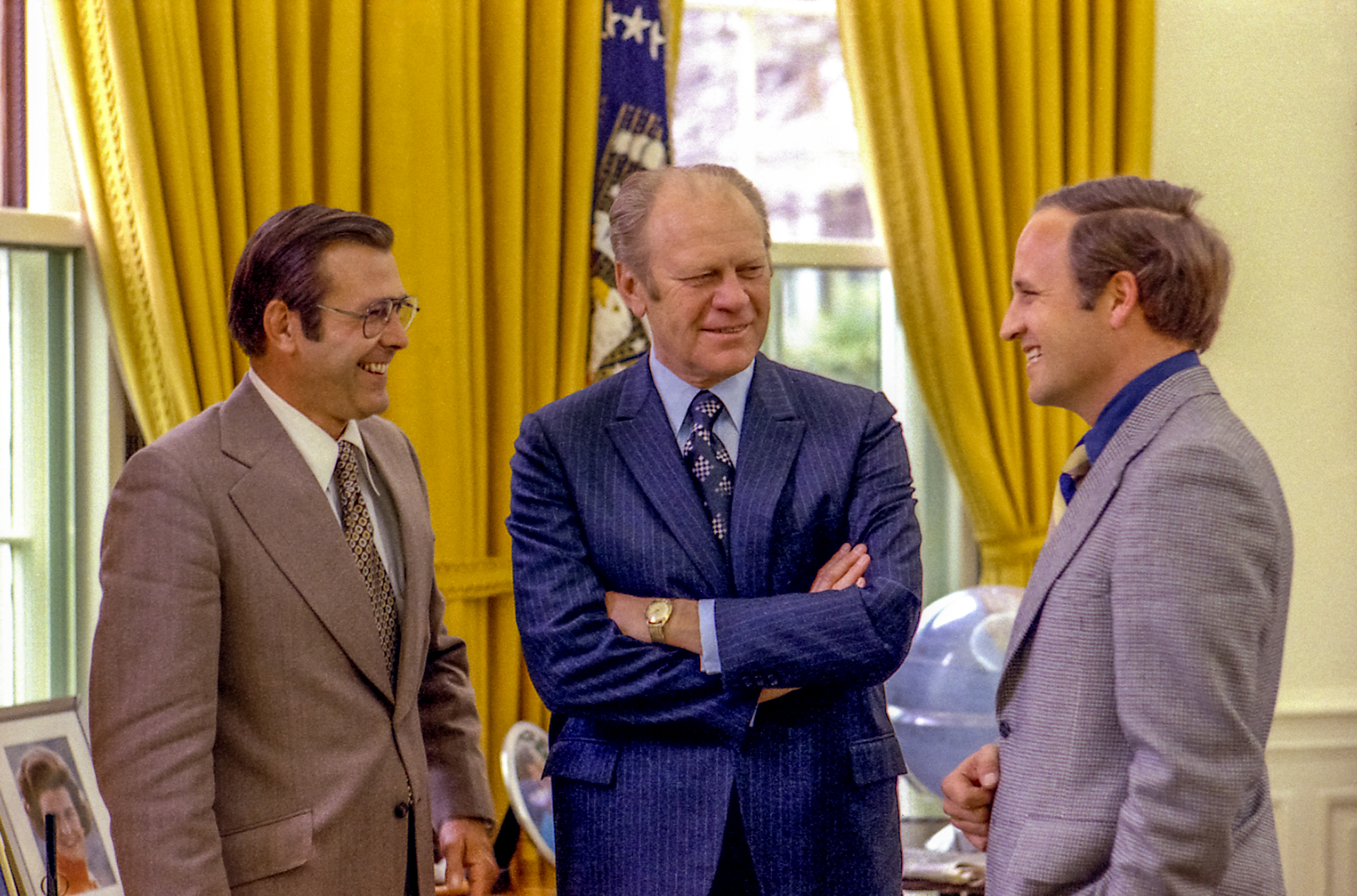
Chief of Staff Rumsfeld (left) and Deputy-Chief of Staff Dick Cheney (right) meet with President Ford on April 28, 1975, two days before the Fall of Saigon

In August 1974, after Nixon resigned as president in the aftermath of the Watergate scandal, Rumsfeld was called back to Washington to serve as the transition chairman for the new president, Gerald Ford. He had been Ford's confidante since their days in the House, before Ford was House minority leader and was one of the members of the "Young Turks" who played a major role in bringing Ford to Republican leadership in the House of Representatives. As the new president became settled in, Ford appointed Rumsfeld White House Chief of Staff, following Ford's appointment of General Alexander Haig to be the new Supreme Allied Commander Europe. Rumsfeld served from 1974 to 1975.

== Secretary of Defense (1975–1977) ==
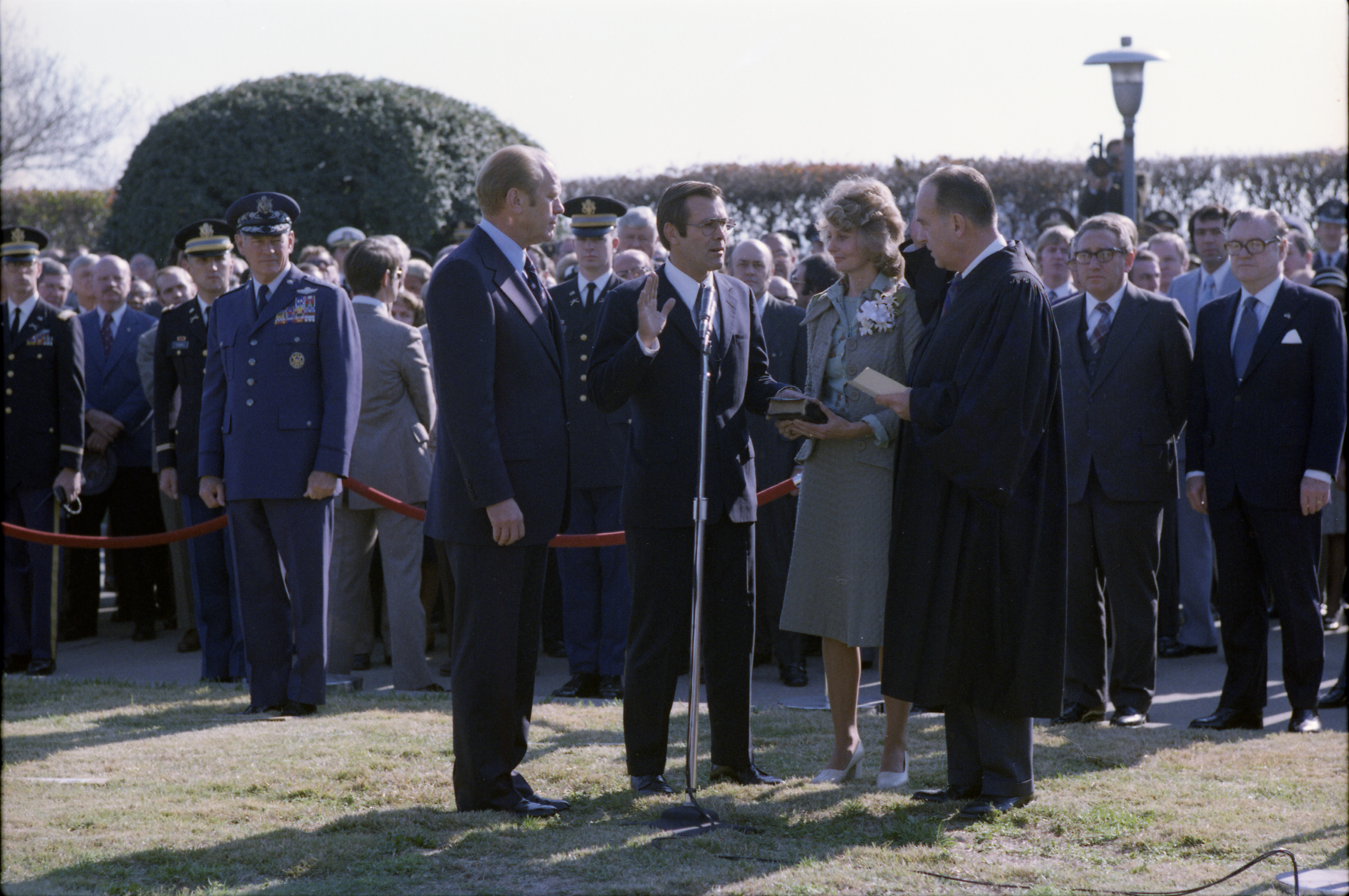
Rumsfeld being sworn in as Secretary of Defense in November 1975.

In October 1975, Ford reshuffled his cabinet in the Halloween Massacre. Various newspaper and magazine articles at the time identified Rumsfeld as having orchestrated these events. Ford named Rumsfeld to succeed Schlesinger as the 13th U.S. Secretary of Defense and George H. W. Bush to become Director of Central Intelligence. According to Bob Woodward's 2002 book Bush at War, a rivalry developed between the two men and "Bush senior was convinced that Rumsfeld was pushing him out to the CIA to end his political career."

Rumsfeld's confirmation hearing as Secretary of Defense began on November 12, 1975. During the hearing, Rumsfeld was mostly asked about the administration's defense policy on the Cold War. Rumsfeld stated that the Soviet Union was a "clear and present danger," especially following the end of the Vietnam War, which Rumsfeld described as the USSR's chance to build up its domination. On November 17, 1975, Rumsfeld was confirmed as Secretary of Defense by a vote of 97–2. At the age of 43, Rumsfeld became the youngest person to serve as United States Secretary of Defense as of 2026.

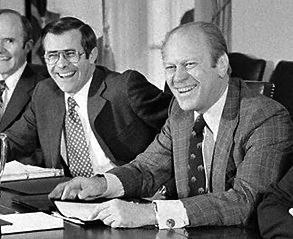
Secretary of Defense Rumsfeld and President Ford sharing a laugh in a Cabinet meeting, 1975.

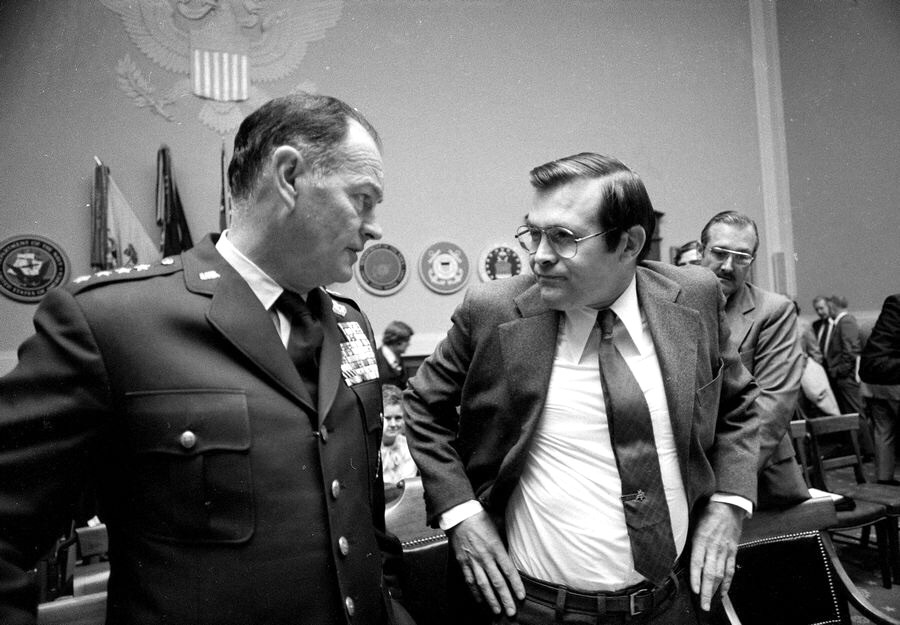
Rumsfeld with Chairman of the Joint Chiefs of Staff General George S. Brown at a Senate Armed Services Committee hearing on January 15, 1976

During his tenure as Secretary of Defense, Rumsfeld oversaw the transition to an all-volunteer military. He sought to reverse the gradual decline in the defense budget and to build up U.S. strategic and conventional forces, undermining Secretary of State Henry Kissinger at the SALT talks. He asserted, along with Team B (which he helped to set up), that trends in comparative U.S.-Soviet military strength had not favored the United States for 15 to 20 years and that, if continued, they "would have the effect of injecting a fundamental instability in the world". For this reason, he oversaw the development of cruise missiles, the B-1 bomber, and a major naval shipbuilding program.

Rumsfeld, along with President Gerald Ford, successfully pressed for Robert Ellsworth to become a second deputy secretary of defense, a position which was created in 1972 but never before filled. More than his predecessors, Rumsfeld frequently traveled both within the U.S. and internationally, acting as an ambassador for the Defense Department, while advocating for a larger budget in order to maintain strategic parity with the Soviet Union.

Rumsfeld, who previously was assigned to the House Committee on Science and Astronautics, emphasized the importance of the next stage of the space program following the successful Moon landing in 1969. While Secretary of Defense, Rumsfeld organized a joint-cooperation between the Department of Defense and NASA to develop Skylab. Another result of the cooperation was the Space Shuttle program.

=== SALT II Treaty ===
During his tenure as Secretary of Defense, Rumsfeld worked to finish the SALT II Treaty. Rumsfeld, together with Chairman of the Joint Chiefs of Staff General George S. Brown drafted the treaty. However, an agreement was not made before the 1976 election. SALT II was finished and signed during the Carter administration.

In 1977, Rumsfeld was awarded the nation's highest civilian award, the Presidential Medal of Freedom. Kissinger, his bureaucratic adversary, later paid him a different sort of compliment, pronouncing him "a special Washington phenomenon: the skilled full-time politician-bureaucrat in whom ambition, ability, and substance fuse seamlessly".

Rumsfeld's first tenure as Secretary of Defense ended on January 20, 1977. He was succeeded by former Secretary of the Air Force Harold Brown.

== Return to the private sector (1977–2000) ==
=== Business career ===
In early 1977 Rumsfeld briefly lectured at Princeton's Woodrow Wilson School and Northwestern's Kellogg School of Management. His sights instead turned to business, and from 1977 to 1985 Rumsfeld was chief executive officer, president, and then chairman of G. D. Searle & Company, a worldwide pharmaceutical company based in Skokie, Illinois. During his tenure at Searle, Rumsfeld led the company's financial turnaround, thereby earning awards as the Outstanding Chief Executive Officer in the Pharmaceutical Industry from the Wall Street Transcript (1980) and Financial World (1981). Journalist Andrew Cockburn of Harper's Magazine claimed that Rumsfeld suppressed news that Searle's key product, aspartame, was shown to have potentially dangerous effects by leveraging old government contacts at the Food and Drug Administration. In 1985, Searle was sold to the Monsanto Company.

Rumsfeld was chairman and chief executive officer of General Instrument from 1990 to 1993. A leader in broadband transmission, distribution, and access control technologies for cable, satellite, and terrestrial broadcasting applications, the company pioneered the development of the first all-digital high-definition television (HDTV) technology. After taking the company public and returning it to profitability, Rumsfeld returned to private business in late 1993.

From January 1997 until being sworn in as the 21st Secretary of Defense in January 2001, Rumsfeld was chairman of Gilead Sciences, Inc. Gilead is the developer of Tamiflu (Oseltamivir), which is used in the treatment of bird flu as well as influenza A and influenza B in humans. As a result, Rumsfeld's holdings in the company grew significantly when avian flu became a subject of popular anxiety during his later term as Secretary of Defense. Following standard practice, Rumsfeld recused himself from any decisions involving Gilead, and he directed the Pentagon's general counsel to issue instructions outlining what he could and could not be involved in if there were an avian flu pandemic and the Pentagon had to respond.

=== Part-time public service ===
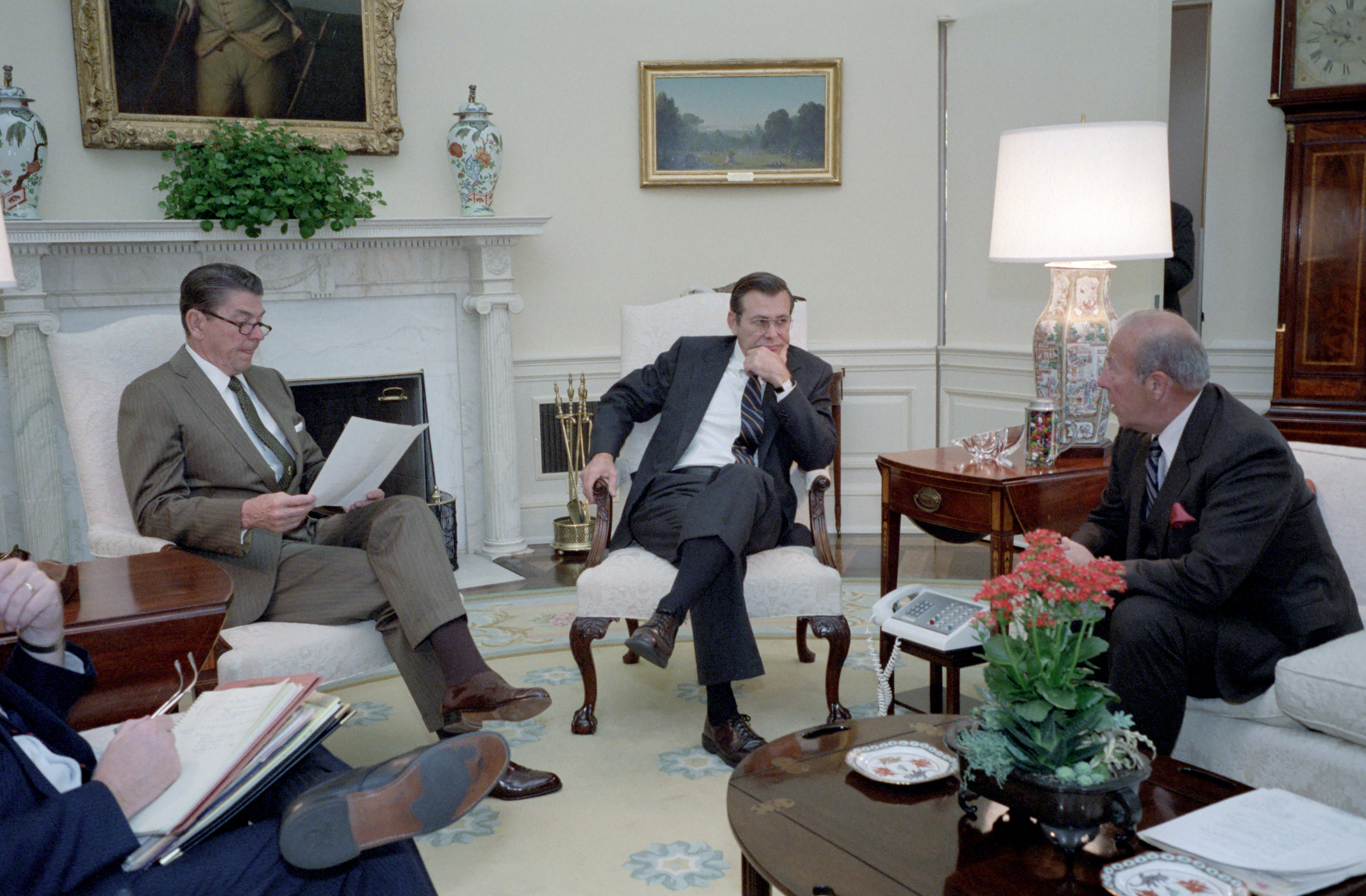
Rumsfeld with President Ronald Reagan and Secretary of State George Shultz in the Oval Office of the White House, November 1983

During his business career, Rumsfeld continued part-time public service in various posts. In November 1983, Rumsfeld was appointed special envoy to the Middle East by President Ronald Reagan, at a turbulent time in modern Middle Eastern history when Iraq was fighting Iran in the Iran–Iraq War. The United States wished for Iraq to win the conflict, and Rumsfeld was sent to the Middle East to serve as a mediator on behalf of the president.

As President Reagan's Special Envoy to the Middle East, Rumsfeld met with Iraqi president Saddam Hussein during a visit to Baghdad in December 1983, during the Iran–Iraq War.

When Rumsfeld visited Baghdad on December 20, 1983, he met Saddam Hussein at Saddam's palace and engaged a 90-minute discussion with him. They largely agreed on opposing Syria's occupation of Lebanon; preventing Syrian and Iranian expansion; and preventing arms sales to Iran. Rumsfeld suggested that if U.S.–Iraq relations could improve the U.S. might support a new oil pipeline across Jordan, which Iraq had opposed but was now willing to reconsider. Rumsfeld also informed Iraqi Deputy Prime Minister and Foreign Minister Tariq Aziz that "Our efforts to assist were inhibited by certain things that made it difficult for us ... citing the use of chemical weapons."

Rumsfeld wrote in his memoir Known and Unknown that his meeting with Hussein "has been the subject of gossip, rumors, and crackpot conspiracy theories for more than a quarter of a century ... Supposedly I had been sent to see Saddam by President Reagan either to negotiate a secret oil deal, to help arm Iraq, or to make Iraq an American client state. The truth is that our encounter was more straightforward and less dramatic." The Washington Post reported that "Although former U.S. officials agree that Rumsfeld was not one of the architects of the Reagan administration's tilt toward Iraq—he was a private citizen when he was appointed Middle East envoy—the documents show that his visits to Baghdad led to closer U.S.–Iraqi cooperation on a wide variety of fronts."

In addition to taking the position of Middle East envoy, Rumsfeld was a member of the President's General Advisory Committee on Arms Control (1982–1986); President Reagan's special envoy on the Law of the Sea Treaty (1982–1983); a senior adviser to President Reagan's Panel on Strategic Systems (1983–1984); a member of the Joint Advisory Commission on U.S./Japan Relations (1983–1984); a member of the National Commission on the Public Service (1987–1990); a member of the National Economic Commission (1988–1989); a member of the board of visitors of the National Defense University (1988–1992); a member of the FCC's High Definition Television Advisory Committee (1992–1993); a member of the U.S. Trade Deficit Review Commission (1999–2000); a member of the Council on Foreign Relations; and chairman of the U.S. Commission to Assess National Security Space Management and Organization (2000). Among his most noteworthy positions was chairman of the nine-member Commission to Assess the Ballistic Missile Threat to the United States from January to July 1998. In its findings, the commission concluded that Iraq, Iran, and North Korea could develop intercontinental ballistic missile capabilities in five to ten years and that U.S. intelligence would have little warning before such systems were deployed.

During the 1980s, Rumsfeld became a member of the National Academy of Public Administration, and was named a member of the boards of trustees of the Gerald R. Ford Foundation, the Eisenhower Exchange Fellowships, the Hoover Institution at Stanford University, and the National Park Foundation. He was also a member of the U.S./Russia Business Forum and chairman of the Congressional Leadership's National Security Advisory Group. Rumsfeld was a member of the Project for the New American Century, a think-tank dedicated to maintaining U.S. primacy. In addition, he was asked to serve the U.S. State Department as a foreign policy consultant from 1990 to 1993. Though considered one of the Bush administration's staunchest hard-liners against North Korea, Rumsfeld sat on European engineering giant Asea Brown Boveri's board from 1990 to 2001, a company that sold two light-water nuclear reactors to the Korean Peninsula Energy Development Organization for installation in North Korea, as part of the 1994 agreed framework reached under President Bill Clinton. Rumsfeld's office said that he did not "recall it being brought before the board at any time" though Fortune magazine reported that "board members were informed about this project". The Bush administration repeatedly criticized the 1994 agreement and the former Clinton presidency for its softness towards North Korea, regarding the country as a state sponsor of terrorism, and later designated North Korea as part of the Axis-of-Evil.

Notably, Rumsfeld had personally signed PNAC's January 1998 open letter to President Bill Clinton, which explicitly called for "taking military action" to remove Saddam Hussein from power, more than three years before the September 11 attacks. This lead critics to argue that regime change in Iraq was a predetermined policy goal for which the attacks served as a pretext.

=== Presidential and vice-presidential aspirations ===
During the 1976 Republican National Convention, Rumsfeld received one vote for Vice President of the United States, although he did not seek the office, and the nomination was easily won by Ford's choice, Senator Bob Dole. During the 1980 Republican National Convention he again received one vote for vice president.

Rumsfeld briefly sought the presidential nomination in 1988, but withdrew from the race before primaries began. During the 1996 election season, he initially formed a presidential exploratory committee, but declined to formally enter the race. He was instead worked on Bob Dole's campaign; initially serving as a policy advisor to Dole, and later being given the honorary title of "general chairman" of the campaign shortly after the 1996 Republican National Convention.

== Secretary of Defense (2001–2006) ==
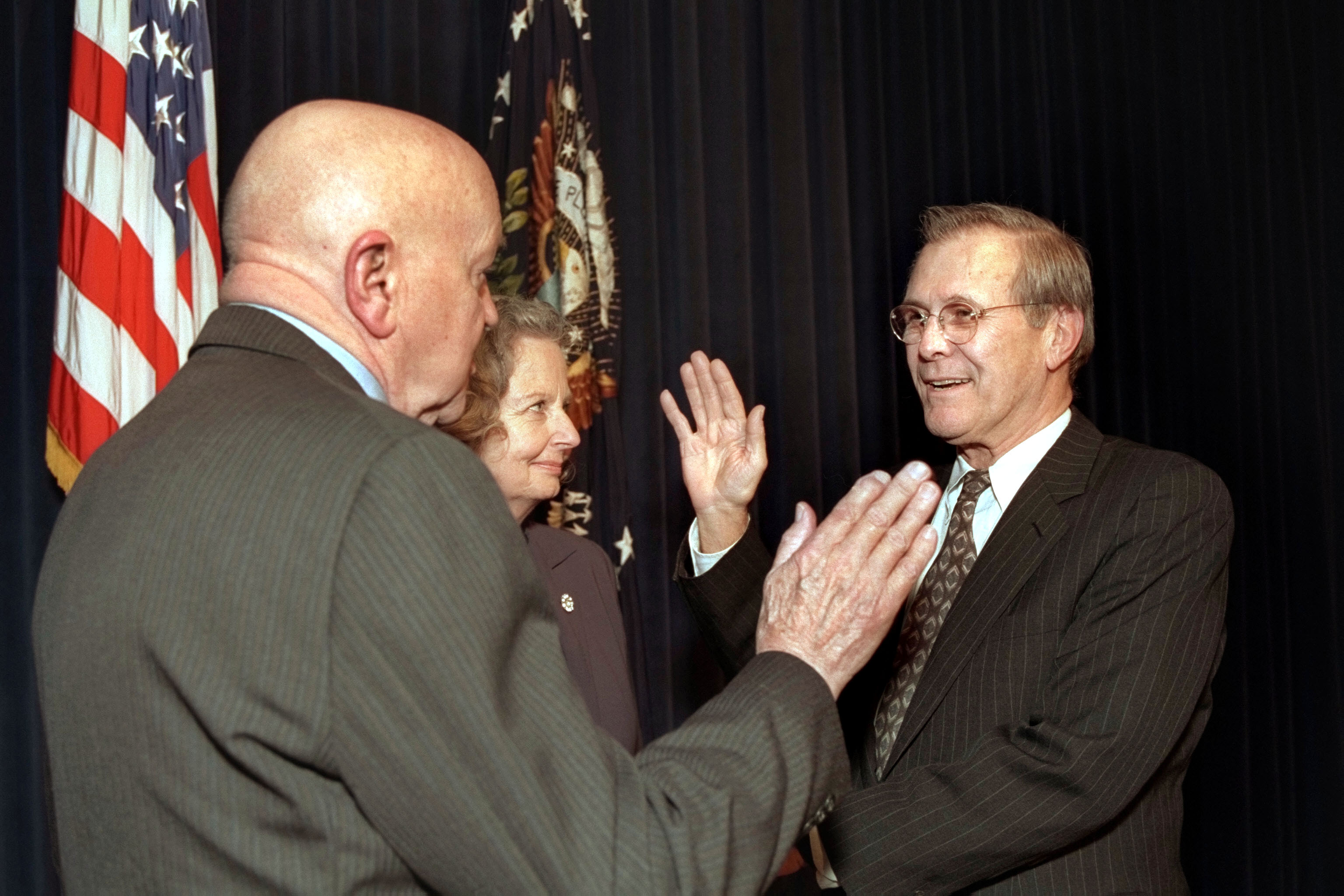
Rumsfeld is administered the oath of office as the 21st Secretary of Defense on January 20, 2001, by Director of Administration and Management David O. Cooke (left), as Joyce Rumsfeld holds the Bible in a ceremony at the Eisenhower Executive Office Building.

Rumsfeld was named Secretary of Defense soon after President George W. Bush took office in 2001 despite Rumsfeld's past rivalry with the previous President Bush. Bush's first choice, FedEx founder Fred Smith, was unavailable and Vice President-elect Cheney recommended Rumsfeld for the job. Rumsfeld's second tenure as Secretary of Defense cemented him as the most powerful Pentagon chief since Robert McNamara and one of the most influential Cabinet members in the Bush administration. His tenure proved to be a pivotal and rocky one that led the United States military into the 21st century. Following the September 11 attacks, Rumsfeld led the military planning and execution of the 2001 United States invasion of Afghanistan and the subsequent 2003 invasion of Iraq. He pushed hard to send as small a force as soon as possible to both conflicts, a concept codified as the Rumsfeld Doctrine.

Throughout his time as defense secretary, Rumsfeld was noted for his candor and quick wit when giving weekly press conferences or speaking with the press. U.S. News & World Report called him "a straight-talking Midwesterner" who "routinely has the press corps doubled over in fits of laughter". By the same token, his leadership was exposed to much criticism through books covering the Iraq conflict, like Bob Woodward's State of Denial, Thomas E. Ricks' Fiasco, and Seymour Hersh's Chain of Command.

=== September 11, 2001, attacks ===
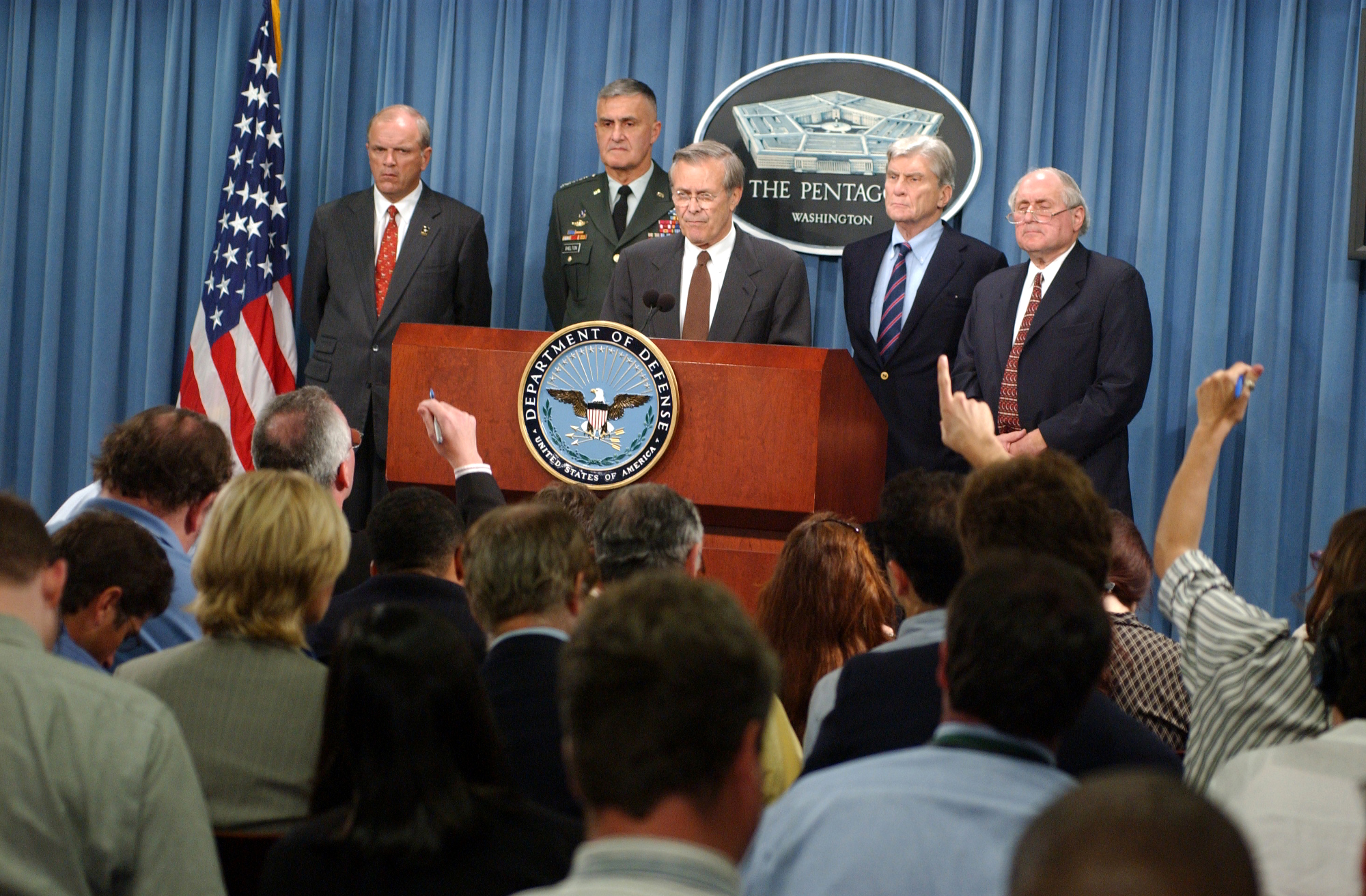
"The Pentagon is functioning" was the message Rumsfeld stressed during a press conference in the Pentagon briefing room barely eight hours after terrorists crashed a hijacked commercial jetliner into the Pentagon. Rumsfeld is flanked, left to right, by Secretary of the Army Tom White, Chairman of the Joint Chiefs of Staff General Hugh Shelton, and Senators John Warner (R-VA), and Carl Levin (D-MI), the Ranking Member and Chairman of the Senate Armed Services Committee.

On September 11, 2001, al-Qaeda terrorists hijacked commercial airliners and crashed them in coordinated strikes into both towers of the World Trade Center in Lower Manhattan, New York City, and the Pentagon in Washington, D.C. The fourth plane crashed into a field in Shanksville, Pennsylvania, and its target was likely a prominent building in Washington, D.C., most probably either the U.S. Capitol Building or the White House. Within three hours of the start of the first hijacking and two hours after American Airlines Flight 11 struck the World Trade Center, Rumsfeld raised the defense condition signaling of the United States offensive readiness to DEFCON 3, the highest it had been since the Arab–Israeli war in 1973.

Rumsfeld addressed the nation in a press conference at the Pentagon, just eight hours after the attacks and stated, "It's an indication that the United States government is functioning in the face of this terrible act against our country. I should add that the briefing here is taking place in the Pentagon. The Pentagon's functioning. It will be in business tomorrow."

=== Military decisions in the wake of 9/11 ===
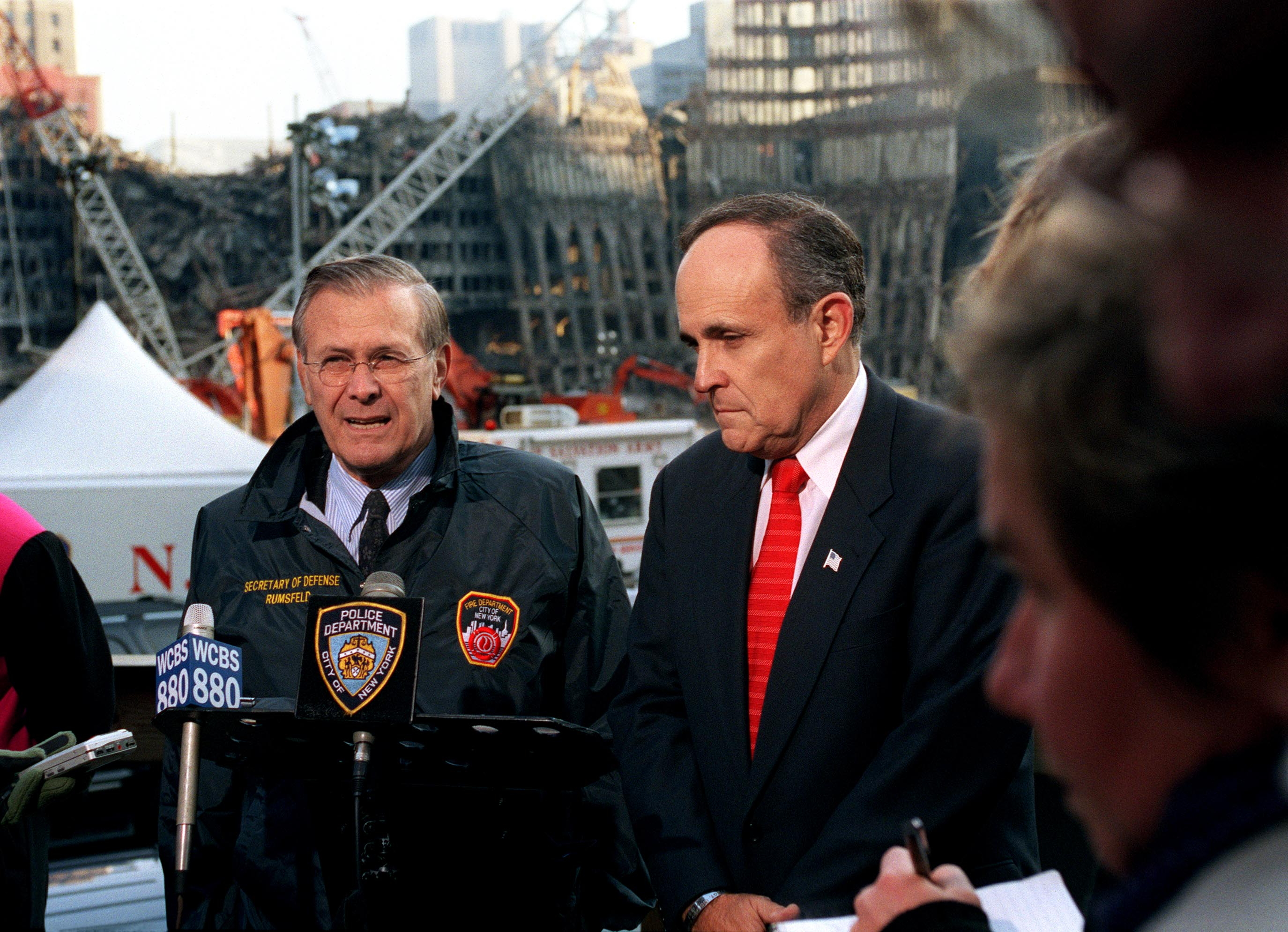
Rumsfeld and New York City Mayor Rudy Giuliani speak at the site of the World Trade Center attacks in Lower Manhattan on November 14, 2001.

On the afternoon of September 11, Rumsfeld issued rapid orders to his aides to look for evidence of possible Iraqi involvement in regard to what had just occurred, according to notes taken by senior policy official Stephen Cambone. "Best info fast. Judge whether good enough hit S.H." – meaning Saddam Hussein – "at same time. Not only UBL" (Osama bin Laden), Cambone's notes quoted Rumsfeld as saying. "Need to move swiftly – Near term target needs – go massive – sweep it all up. Things related and not."

In the first emergency meeting of the National Security Council on the day of the attacks, Rumsfeld asked, "Why shouldn't we go against Iraq, not just al-Qaeda?" with his deputy Paul Wolfowitz adding that Iraq was a "brittle, oppressive regime that might break easily—it was doable," and, according to John Kampfner, "from that moment on, he and Wolfowitz used every available opportunity to press the case." President George W. Bush reacted to Rumsfeld's suggestion, "Wait a minute, I didn't hear a word said about him (Saddam Hussein) being responsible for the attack" and the idea was initially rejected at the behest of Secretary of State Colin Powell, but, according to Kampfner, "Undeterred Rumsfeld and Wolfowitz held secret meetings about opening up a second front—against Saddam. Powell was excluded." In such meetings they created a policy that would later be dubbed the Bush Doctrine, centering on "pre-emption" and the war on Iraq, which the PNAC had advocated in their earlier letters.

Richard A. Clarke, the White House counter-terrorism coordinator at the time, has revealed details of another National Security Council meeting the day after the attacks, during which officials considered the U.S. response. Already, he said, they were certain al-Qa'ida was to blame and there was no hint of Iraqi involvement. "Rumsfeld was saying we needed to bomb Iraq," according to Clarke. Clarke then stated, "We all said, 'No, no, al-Qa'ida is in Afghanistan.'" Clarke also revealed that Rumsfeld complained in the meeting, "there aren't any good targets in Afghanistan and there are lots of good targets in Iraq." Rumsfeld even suggested to attack other countries like Libya and Sudan, arguing that if this was to be a truly "global war on terror" then all state sponsors of terrorism should be dealt with.

Rumsfeld wrote in Known and Unknown, "Much has been written about the Bush administration's focus on Iraq after 9/11. Commentators have suggested that it was strange or obsessive for the President and his advisers to have raised questions about whether Saddam Hussein was somehow behind the attack. I have never understood the controversy. I had no idea if Iraq was or was not involved, but it would have been irresponsible for any administration not to have asked the question."

A memo written by Rumsfeld dated November 27, 2001, considers an Iraq war. One section of the memo questions "How start?", listing multiple possible justifications for a U.S.–Iraq War.

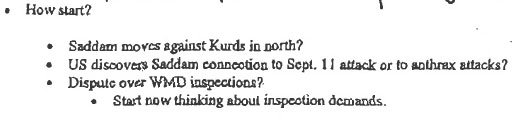
Excerpt from Donald Rumsfeld memo dated November 27, 2001

=== War in Afghanistan ===
Rumsfeld directed the planning for the War in Afghanistan after the September 11 attacks. On September 21, 2001, USCENTCOM Commander General Tommy Franks, briefed the President on a plan to destroy al-Qaeda in Afghanistan and remove the Taliban government. General Franks also initially proposed to Rumsfeld that the U.S. invade Afghanistan using a conventional force of 60,000 troops, preceded by six months of preparation. Rumsfeld, however feared that a conventional invasion of Afghanistan could bog down as had happened to the Soviets in the Soviet–Afghan War and the 1842 retreat from Kabul by the British. Rumsfeld rejected Franks's plan, saying "I want men on the ground now!" Franks returned the next day with a plan utilizing U.S. Special Forces. Despite air and missile attacks against al-Qaeda in Afghanistan, USCENTCOM had no pre-existing plans for conducting ground operations there.

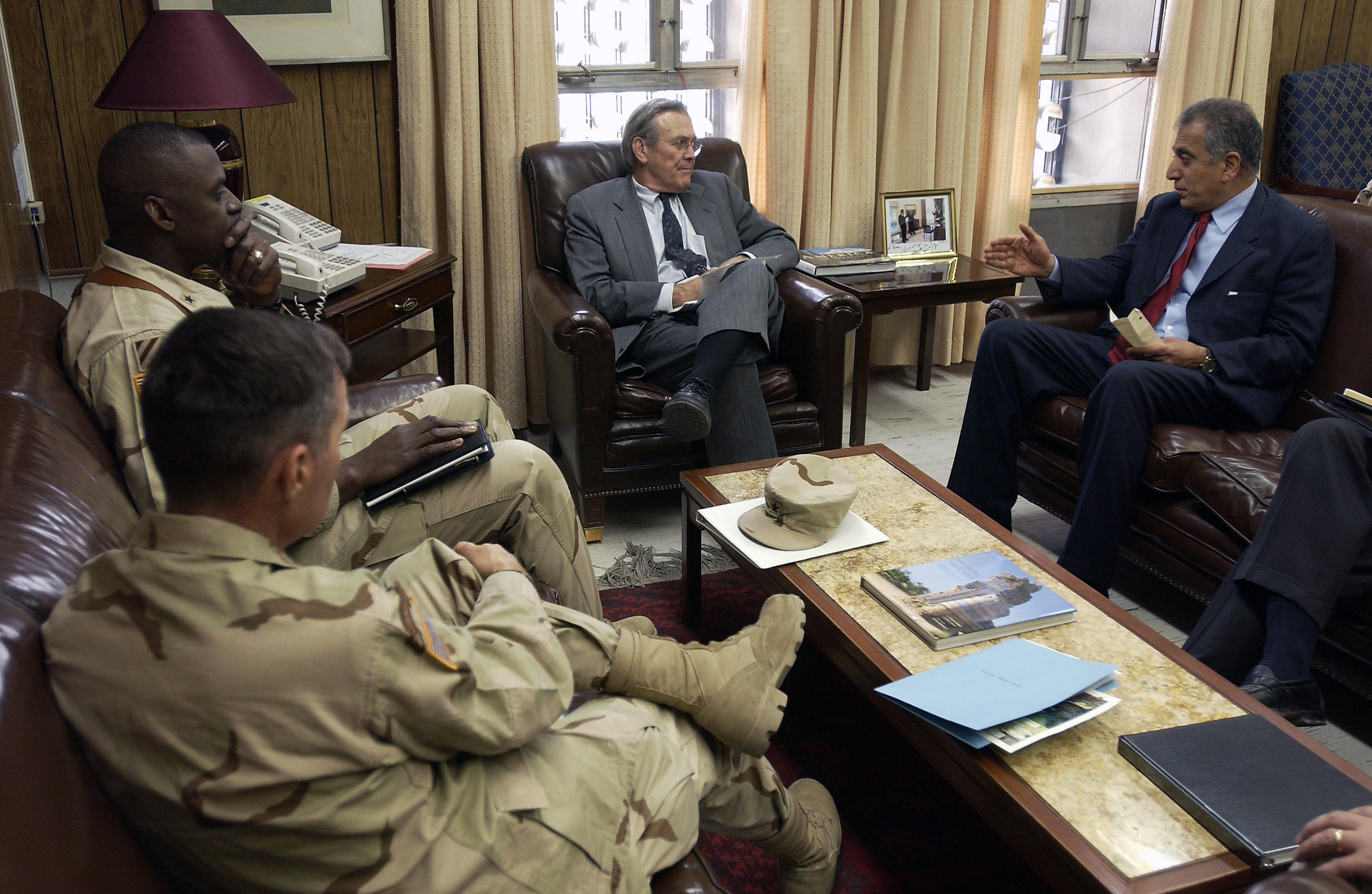
Rumsfeld (center) converses with U.S. ambassador to Afghanistan Zalmay Khalilzad (right) as Brig. Gen. Lloyd Austin (top left) looks on during a visit to Kandahar, Afghanistan, on February 26, 2004.

The September 21, 2001, plan emerged after extensive dialogue, but Secretary Rumsfeld also asked for broader plans that looked beyond Afghanistan.

On October 7, 2001, just hours after the 2001 invasion of Afghanistan was launched, Rumsfeld addressed the nation in a press conference at the Pentagon stating "While our raids today focus on the Taliban and the foreign terrorists in Afghanistan, our aim remains much broader. Our objective is to defeat those who use terrorism and those who house or support them. The world stands united in this effort".

Rumsfeld also stated "the only way to deal with these terrorist threats is to go at them where they exist. You cannot defend at every place at every time against every conceivable, imaginable, even unimaginable terrorist attack. And the only way to deal with it is to take the battle to where they are and to root them out and to starve them out by seeing that those countries and those organizations and those non-governmental organizations and those individuals that are supporting and harboring and facilitating these networks stop doing it and find that there's a penalty for doing it".

Rumsfeld in another press conference at the Pentagon on October 29, 2001, stated "As the first weeks of this effort proceed, it bears repeating that our goal is not to reduce or simply contain terrorist acts, but our goal is to deal with it comprehensively. And we do not intend to stop until we've rooted out terrorist networks and put them out of business, not just in the case of the Taliban and the Al Qaeda in Afghanistan, but other networks as well. And as I've mentioned, the Al Qaeda network crosses some 40, 50-plus countries."

Rumsfeld announced in November 2001, that he received "authoritative reports" that Al-Qaeda's number three Mohammed Atef, bin Laden's primary military chief and a planner of the September 11 attacks on America, was killed by a U.S. airstrike. "He was very, very senior," Rumsfeld said. "We obviously have been seeking [him] out."

In a press conference at the Pentagon on November 19, 2001, Rumsfeld described the role of U.S. ground forces in Afghanistan as firstly in the north, American troops are "embedded in Northern Alliance" elements, helping arrange food and medical supplies and pinpointing airstrikes and in the south, commandos and other troops are operating more independently, raiding compounds, monitoring roadblocks and searching vehicles in the hope of developing more information about al-Qaeda and Taliban leaders. On December 16, 2001, Rumsfeld visited U.S. troops in Afghanistan at Bagram Air Base.

On March 15, 2002, in another press conference at the Pentagon, Rumsfeld commented on the mission of Operation Anaconda by stating "Operation Anaconda continues in the area south of Gardez in eastern Afghanistan. The fighting is winding down as you know. Coalition forces are for the most part in an exploitation phase, doing the difficult work of searching caves and clearing areas where the battles and fighting has taken place. Our forces are finding weapons, ammunition, some intelligence information. In the top 25 al Qaeda, we know some are dead and we know some may be dead; we know some are captured and there are a larger number that we don't know. And roughly the same proportions with respect to Taliban".

On May 1, 2003, Rumsfeld during a visit to Afghanistan meeting with U.S. troops stationed in Kabul told the press "General Franks and I have been looking at the progress that's being made in this country and have concluded that we are at a point where we clearly have moved from major combat activity to a period of stability and stabilization and reconstruction and activities." "I should underline however, that there are still dangers, there are still pockets of resistance in certain parts of the country and General McNeal and General Franks and their, the cooperation they have with the President Karzai's government and leadership and Marshall Fayheems assistance. We will be continuing as a country to work with the Afghan government and the new Afghan National Army to see that the any areas where there is resistance to this government and to the coalition forces will be dealt with promptly and efficiently."

There was also controversy between the Pentagon and the CIA over who had the authority to fire Hellfire missiles from Predator drones. Even though the drones were not ready for deployment until 2002, Daniel Benjamin and Steven Simon have argued that "these quarrels kept the Predator from being used against al Qaeda ... One anonymous individual who was at the center of the action called this episode 'typical' and complained that 'Rumsfeld never missed an opportunity to fail to cooperate. The fact is, the Secretary of Defense is an obstacle. He has helped the terrorists.'

In December 2005, Rumsfeld again visited Kabul and met with the Afghan defense minister, Rahim Wardak. During the meeting, Rumsfeld expressed doubts about the effectiveness of the Afghan army and attributed the worsening situation in Afghanistan to ineffective governance. He criticized the longstanding plan to expand the Afghan army to 70,000 troops and requested a reduction in the size of the Afghan army to 52,000 at most, claiming that this was necessary to "suit Afghanistan's limited revenues." Shortly after the trip, Rumsfeld also withdrew 3,000 U.S. troops from Afghanistan and canceled the planned deployment of one army brigade headed there.

In 2009, three years after Rumsfeld's tenure as Defense secretary ended, the United States Senate Committee on Foreign Relations led an investigation into the Battle of Tora Bora in December 2001, during the early phase of the U.S-led coalition war in Afghanistan. They concluded that Secretary of Defense Rumsfeld and General Franks had not committed enough troops during the battle to secure the area around Tora Bora. They believed that Al-Qaeda's number one leader Osama bin Laden had likely been at Tora Bora and his escape prolonged the war in Afghanistan. Rumsfeld and Franks were apparently motivated by fear that a substantial American presence near Tora Bora could incite a rebellion by local Pashtuns, despite the latter's lack of organizational capability at the time and the fierce dissent voiced by many CIA analysts including Charles E. Allen (who warned Franks that "the back door [to Pakistan] was open") and Gary Berntsen (who called for army rangers to "kill this baby in the crib"). Instead of rangers or marines, the U.S. assault on Tora Bora relied on the CIA-backed Afghan militias of Hazrat Ali and Zahir Qadeer, supplemented with B-52 bombardment. The resulting influx of hundreds of al-Qaeda fighters into Pakistan destabilized the country and damaged Pakistan–United States relations. The follow-up Operation Anaconda "witnessed failures of planning and execution, the product of the fractured lines of command," as recounted by Steve Coll. In mid-2002, Rumsfeld announced that "The war is over in Afghanistan," to the disbelief of State Department, CIA, and military officials in the country. As a result, Rumsfeld downplayed the need for an Afghan army of even 70,000 troops, far fewer than the 250,000 envisaged by Karzai.

=== Iraq War ===
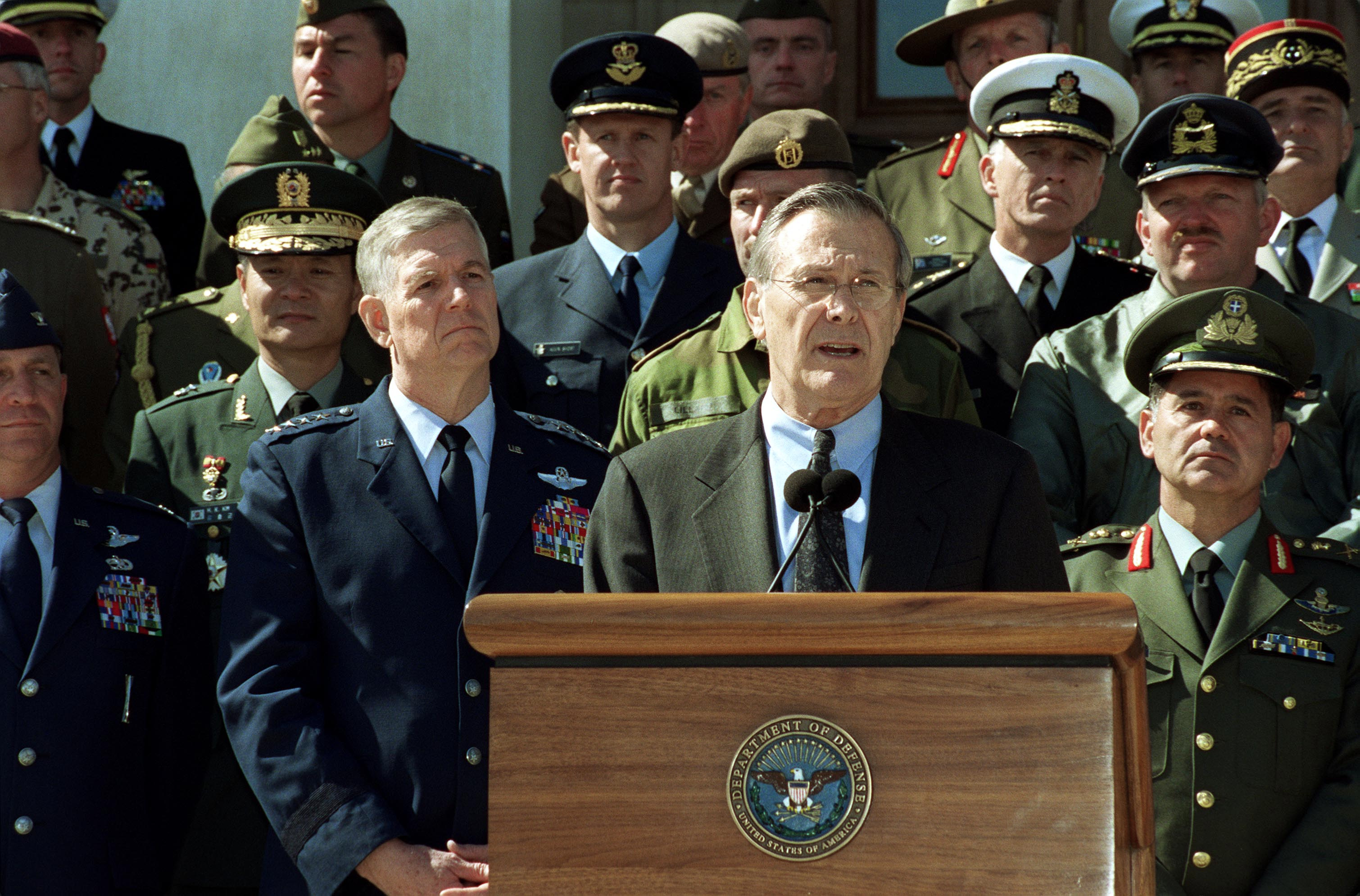
Rumsfeld, accompanied by General Richard Myers and military representatives from the International Security Assistance Force, speaks to the press on March 11, 2002.

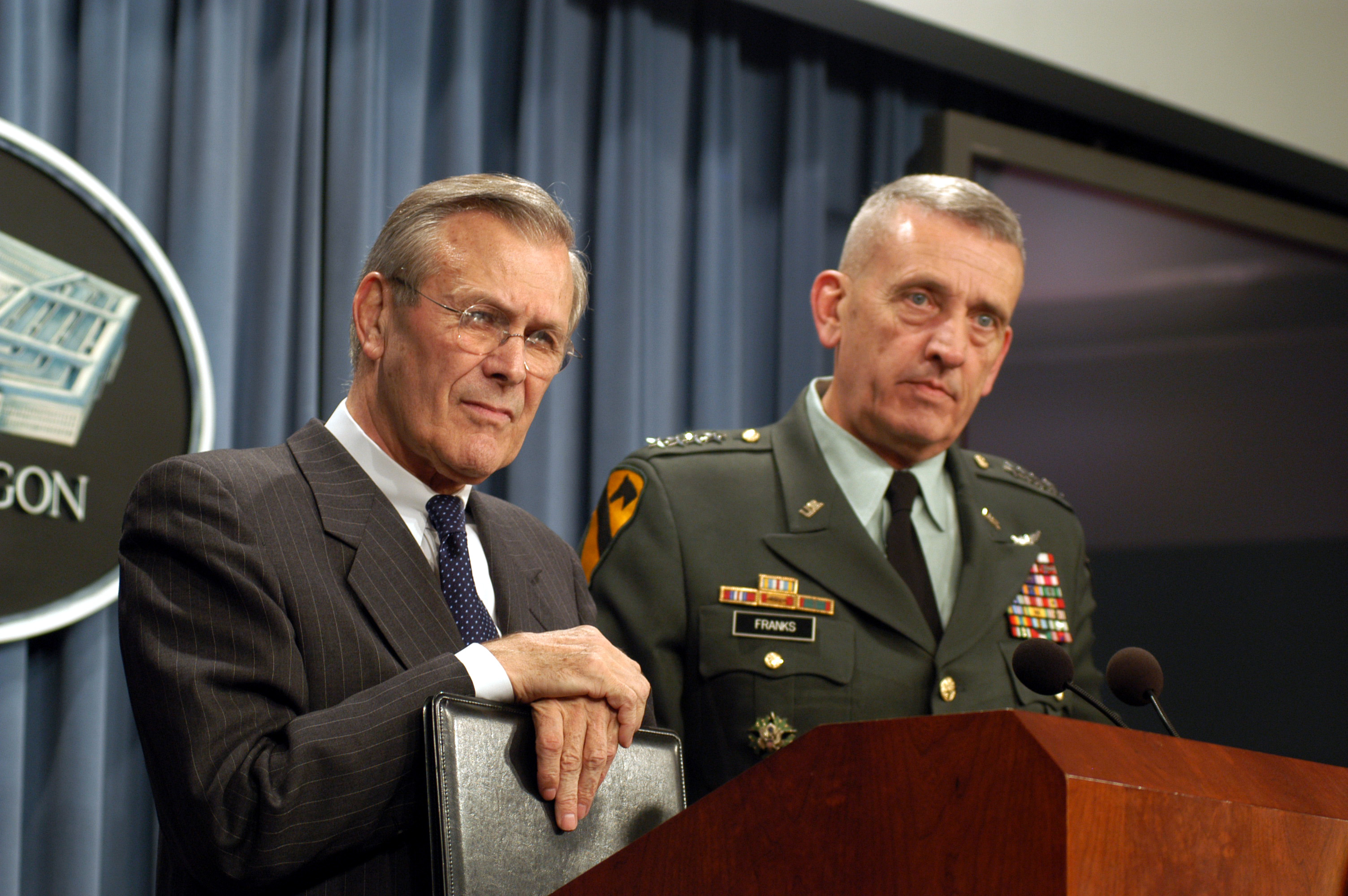
Rumsfeld (left) and General Tommy Franks (right), commander of United States Central Command, listen to a question at a Pentagon press conference on March 5, 2003.

Before and during the Iraq War, Rumsfeld claimed that Iraq had an active weapons of mass destruction program; in particular during his famous phrase "there are known knowns" in a press conference at the Pentagon on February 12, 2002, no stockpiles were ever found. Bush administration officials also claimed that there was an operational relationship between al-Qaeda and Saddam Hussein. A Pentagon Inspector General report found that Rumsfeld's top policy aide, Douglas J. Feith, "developed, produced, and then disseminated alternative intelligence assessments on the Iraq and al-Qaeda relationship, which included some conclusions that were inconsistent with the consensus of the Intelligence Community, to senior decision-makers".

The job of finding WMD and providing justification for the attack fell to the intelligence services, but, according to Kampfner, "Rumsfeld and Wolfowitz believed that, while the established security services had a role, they were too bureaucratic and too traditional in their thinking." As a result, "they set up what came to be known as the 'cabal', a cell of eight or nine analysts in a new Office of Special Plans (OSP) based in the U.S. Defense Department." According to an unnamed Pentagon source quoted by Hersh, the OSP "was created in order to find evidence of what Wolfowitz and his boss, Defense Secretary Rumsfeld, believed to be true—that Saddam Hussein had close ties to Al Qaeda, and that Iraq had an enormous arsenal of chemical, biological, and possibly even nuclear weapons that threatened the region and, potentially, the United States".

On January 22, 2003, after the German and French governments voiced opposition to invading Iraq, Rumsfeld labeled these countries as part of "Old Europe", implying that countries that supported the war were part of a newer, modern Europe.

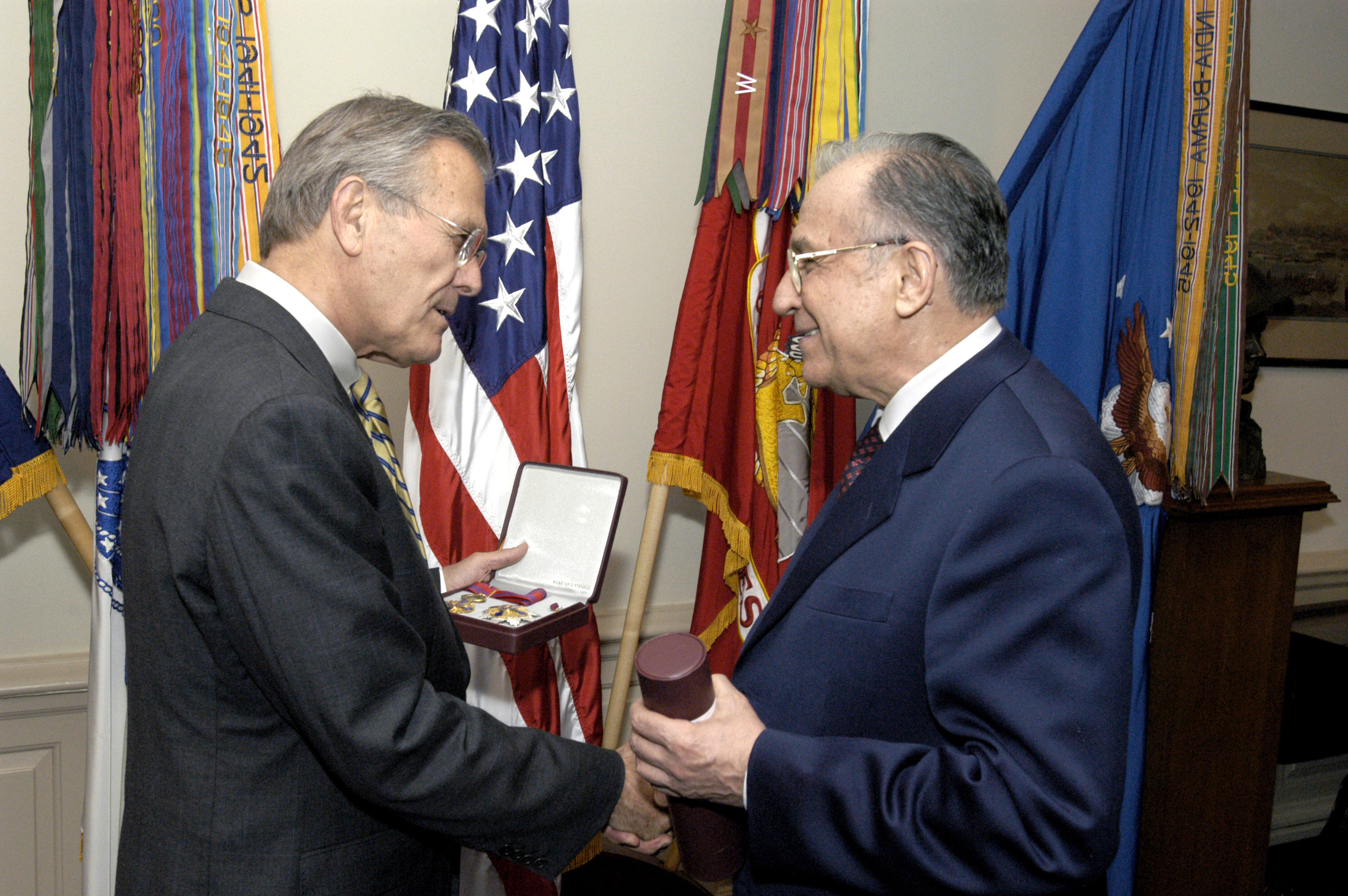
Romanian President Ion Iliescu (right) awards the "Star of Romania" decoration to Secretary of Defense Donald H. Rumsfeld.

After the war in Afghanistan was launched, Rumsfeld participated in a meeting in regard to the review of the Department of Defense's Contingency Plan in the event of a war with Iraq. The plan, as it was then conceived, contemplated troop levels of up to 500,000, which Rumsfeld felt was far too many. Gordon and Trainor wrote:

As [General] Newbold outlined the plan ... it was clear that Rumsfeld was growing increasingly irritated. For Rumsfeld, the plan required too many troops and supplies and took far too long to execute. It was, Rumsfeld declared, the "product of old thinking and the embodiment of everything that was wrong with the military".

In a press conference at the Pentagon on February 27, 2003, Rumsfeld told reporters after being asked a question that Army Chief of Staff General Eric Shinseki suggested it would take several hundred thousand troops on the ground to secure Iraq and provide stability. Rumsfeld replied "the idea that it would take several hundred thousand U.S. forces I think is far from the mark. The reality is that we already have a number of countries that have offered to participate with their forces in stabilization activities, in the event force has to be used."

Rumsfeld addressed the nation in a press conference at the Pentagon on March 20, 2003, just hours after the launch of the 2003 Invasion of Iraq, where he announced the first strike of the war to liberate Iraq and that "The days of the Saddam Hussein regime are numbered," and "We continue to feel there is no need for a broader conflict if the Iraqi leaders act to save themselves and act to prevent such a conflict."

Rumsfeld's role in directing the Iraq War included a plan that was the Shock and Awe campaign, which resulted in a lightning invasion with 145,000 soldiers on the ground that took Baghdad within three weeks. Many government buildings, plus major museums, electrical generation infrastructure, and even oil equipment were looted and vandalized during the transition from the fall of Saddam Hussein's regime to the establishment of the Coalition Provisional Authority. A violent insurrection began shortly after the military operation started.

After Coalition Provisional Authority Order 2 was signed by Coalition Provisional Authority administrator Paul Bremer on May 23, 2003, the Iraqi military was formally dissolved, leaving 400,000 former soldiers without employment or income. Military analysts identified this decision as the primary catalyst for the Iraqi insurgency. Bremer stated he informed Rumsfeld of the order prior to its issuance but Rumsfeld disputed this account in his memoir.

On March 30, 2003, in an interview with George Stephanopoulos on ABC's This Week program, Rumsfeld answered a question by Stephanopoulos about finding weapons of mass destruction in Iraq, Rumsfeld stated "We know where they are. They're in the area around Tikrit and Baghdad and east, west, south and north somewhat."

On April 9, 2003, at a press conference at the Pentagon, Rumsfeld addressed reporters during the Fall of Baghdad, and stated "The scenes of free Iraqis celebrating in the streets, riding American tanks, tearing down the statues of Saddam Hussein in the center of Baghdad are breathtaking."

After the Iraq invasion, U.S. troops were criticized for not protecting the historical artifacts and treasures located at the National Museum of Iraq. On April 11, 2003, at a press conference at the Pentagon, when asked at the time why U.S. troops did not actively seek to stop the lawlessness, Rumsfeld replied, "Stuff happens ... and it's untidy and freedom's untidy, and free people are free to make mistakes and commit crimes and do bad things. They're also free to live their lives and do wonderful things. And that's what's going to happen here." He further commented that, "The images you are seeing on television you are seeing over, and over, and over, and it's the same picture of some person walking out of some building with a vase, and you see it 20 times, and you think, "My goodness, were there that many vases?"

On July 24, 2003, at a press conference at the Pentagon, Rumsfeld commented on the release of photographs of the deceased sons of Saddam Hussein, Uday Hussein and Qusay Hussein. "It is not a practice that the United States engages in on a normal basis," Rumsfeld said. "I honestly believe that these two are particularly bad characters and that it's important for the Iraqi people to see them, to know they're gone, to know they're dead, and to know they're not coming back." Rumsfeld also said, "I feel it was the right decision, and I'm glad I made it."

In October 2003, Rumsfeld approved a secret Pentagon "roadmap" on public relations, calling for "boundaries" between information operations abroad and the news media at home. The Roadmap advances a policy according to which as long as the U.S. government does not intentionally target the American public, it does not matter that psychological operations reach the American public.

On December 14, 2003, Rumsfeld in an interview with journalist Lesley Stahl on 60 Minutes after U.S. forces captured Saddam Hussein in Operation Red Dawn, stated, "Here was a man who was photographed hundreds of times shooting off rifles and showing how tough he was, and in fact, he wasn't very tough, he was cowering in a hole in the ground, and had a pistol and didn't use it, and certainly did not put up any fight at all. I think that ... he resulted in the death of an awful lot of Iraqi people, in the last analysis, he seemed not terribly brave."

As Secretary of Defense, Rumsfeld was deliberate in crafting the public message from the Department of Defense. People will "rally" to the word "sacrifice", Rumsfeld noted after a meeting. "They are looking for leadership. Sacrifice = Victory." In May 2004, Rumsfeld considered whether to redefine the war on terrorism as a fight against "worldwide insurgency". He advised aides "to test what the results could be" if the war on terrorism were renamed. Rumsfeld also ordered specific public Pentagon attacks on and responses to U.S. newspaper columns that reported the negative aspects of the war.

During Rumsfeld's tenure, he regularly visited U.S. troops stationed in Iraq.

The Australian Broadcasting Corporation reported that though Rumsfeld didn't specify a withdrawal date for troops in Iraq, "He says it would be unrealistic to wait for Iraq to be peaceful before removing U.S. led forces from the country, adding that Iraq had never been peaceful and perfect."

On August 2, 2006, at a press conference at the Pentagon, Rumsfeld commented on the sectarian violence in Iraq where he stated "there's sectarian violence; people are being killed. Sunnis are killing Shi'a and Shi'a are killing Sunnis. Kurds seem not to be involved. It's unfortunate, and they need a reconciliation process."

On October 26, 2006, at a press conference at the Pentagon after the failure of Operation Together Forward in Iraq, Rumsfeld referenced a magazine column recently published by Time that was entitled 'Would defeat in Iraq be so bad?' and stated "Well, the answer is: Yes, it would be. Those who are fighting against the Iraqi government want to seize power so that they can establish a new sanctuary and a base of operations for terrorists and any idea that U.S. military leaders are rigidly refusing to make adjustments in their approaches is just flat wrong. The military is continuing to adapt and to adjust as required. Yes, there are difficulties and problems to be sure."

As a result, Rumsfeld stirred controversy as to whether the forces that did invade Iraq were enough in size. In 2006, Rumsfeld responded to a question by Brit Hume of Fox News as to whether he pressed General Tommy Franks to lower his request for 400,000 troops for the war:

Absolutely not. That's a mythology. This town [Washington, D.C.] is filled with this kind of nonsense. The people who decide the levels of forces on the ground are not the Secretary of Defense or the President. We hear recommendations, but the recommendations are made by the combatant commanders and by members of the Joint Chiefs of Staff and there hasn't been a minute in the last six years when we have not had the number of troops that the combatant commanders have requested.

Rumsfeld told Hume that Franks ultimately decided against such a troop level.

Throughout his tenure, Rumsfeld sought to remind the American people of the 9/11 attacks and threats against Americans, noting at one time in a 2006 memo to "[m]ake the American people realize they are surrounded in the world by violent extremists". According to a report by The Guardian, Rumsfeld was allegedly including biblical quotes in top secret briefing papers to appeal George W Bush, known for his devout religious beliefs, to invade Iraq as more like "holy war" or "a religious crusade" against Muslims.

In a September 2007 interview with The Daily Telegraph, General Mike Jackson, the head of the British army during the invasion, criticized Rumsfeld's plans for the invasion of Iraq as "intellectually bankrupt", adding that Rumsfeld is "one of those most responsible for the current situation in Iraq", and that he felt that "the US approach to combating global terrorism is 'inadequate' and too focused on military might rather than nation building and diplomacy."

In December 2004, Rumsfeld was heavily criticized for using a signing machine instead of personally signing over 1000 letters of condolence to the families of soldiers killed in action in Iraq and Afghanistan. He promised to personally sign all letters in the future.

=== Prisoner abuse and torture concerns ===
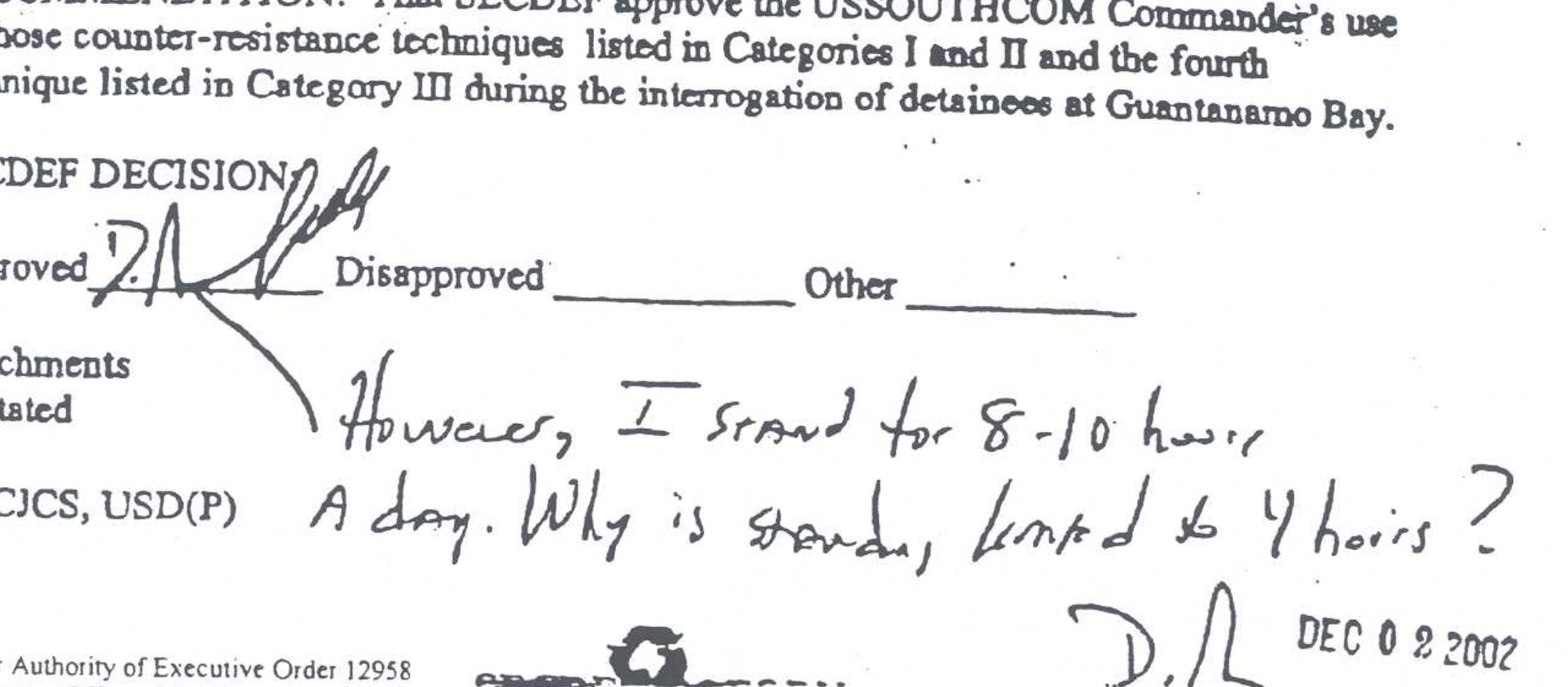
Comment from Rumsfeld: "I stand for 8–10 hours a day. Why is standing [by prisoners] limited to 4 hours?"

The Department of Defense's preliminary concerns for holding, housing, and interrogating captured prisoners on the battlefield were raised during the military build-up prior to the Iraq War. Because Saddam Hussein's military forces surrendered when faced with military action, many within the DOD, including Rumsfeld and United States Central Command General Tommy Franks, decided it was in the best interest of all to hand these prisoners over to their respective countries. Additionally, it was determined that maintaining a large holding facility was, at the time, unrealistic. Instead, the use of many facilities such as Abu Ghraib to house prisoners of interest prior to handing them over, and Rumsfeld defended the Bush administration's decision to detain enemy combatants. Because of this, critics, including members of the U.S. Senate Armed Services Committee, held Rumsfeld responsible for the ensuing Abu Ghraib torture and prisoner abuse scandal. Rumsfeld himself said: "These events occurred on my watch as Secretary of Defense. I am accountable for them." He offered his resignation to President Bush in the wake of the scandal, but it was not accepted.

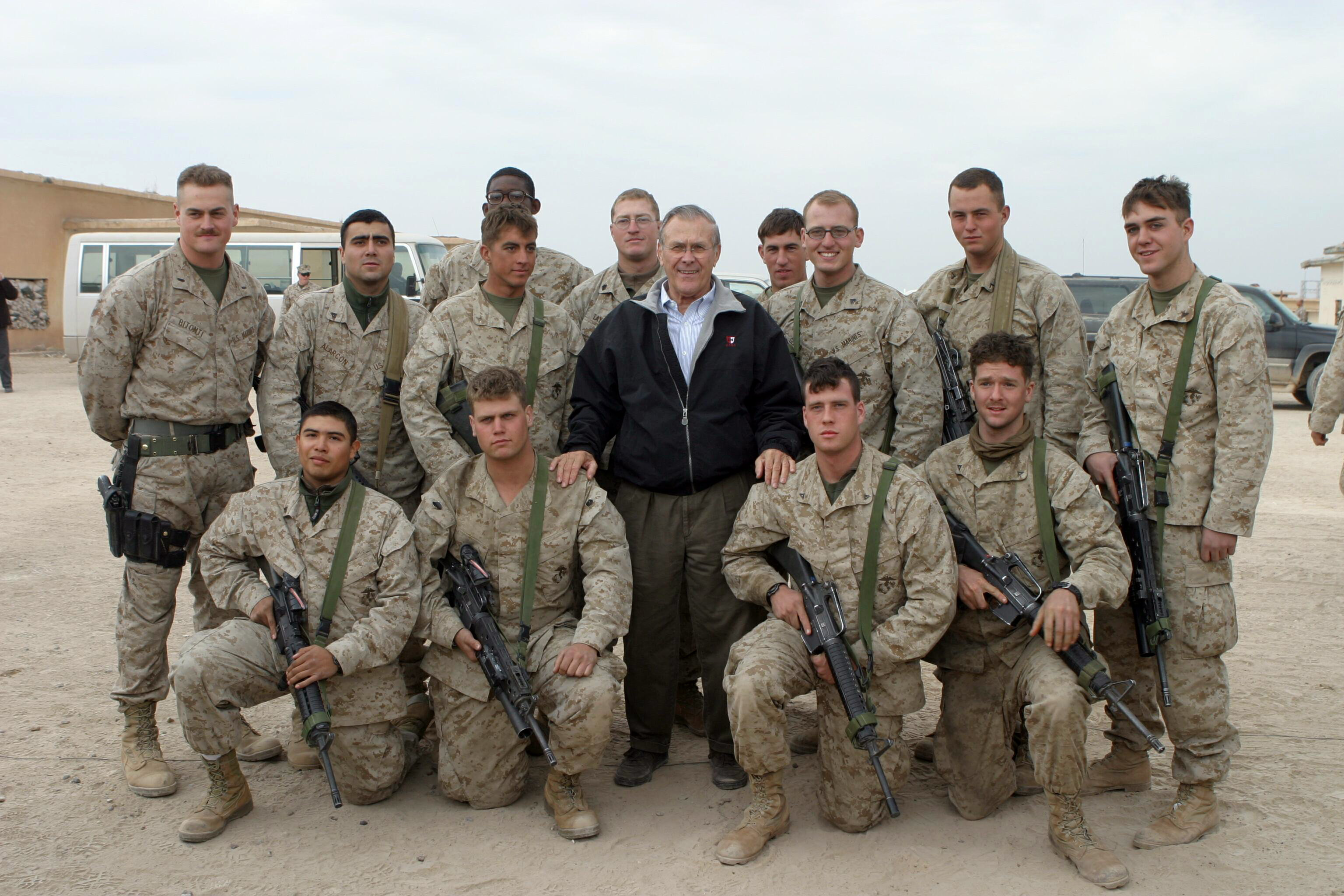
Rumsfeld poses with Marines during one of his trips to Camp Fallujah, Iraq, on Christmas Eve 2004.

In a memo read by Rumsfeld detailing how Guantanamo Bay detention camp interrogators induced stress in prisoners by forcing them to remain standing in one position for a maximum of four hours, Rumsfeld scrawled a handwritten note on the memo reading: "I stand for 8–10 hours a day. Why is standing [by prisoners] limited to 4 hours? D.R."

Various organizations, such as Human Rights Watch, called for investigations of Rumsfeld regarding his involvement in managing the Iraq War and his support of the Bush administration's policies of "enhanced interrogation techniques", which are widely regarded as torture.

Legal scholars have argued that Rumsfeld "might be held criminally responsible if [he] would be prosecuted by the ICC". In 2005 the ACLU and Human Rights First filed a lawsuit against Rumsfeld and other top government officials, "on behalf of eight men who they say were subjected to torture and abuse by U.S. forces under the command of Defense Secretary Donald Rumsfeld".

In 2005, a suit was filed against Rumsfeld by several human rights organizations for allegedly violating U.S. and international law that prohibits "torture and cruel, inhuman, or degrading punishment". Donald Vance and Nathan Ertel filed suit against the U.S. government and Rumsfeld on similar grounds, alleging that they were tortured and their rights of habeas corpus were violated. In 2007, U.S. District Judge Thomas F. Hogan ruled that Rumsfeld could not "be held personally responsible for actions taken in connection with his government job". The ACLU tried to revive the case in 2011 with no success.

In 2004, German prosecutor Wolfgang Kaleck filed a criminal complaint charging Rumsfeld and 11 other U.S. officials as war criminals who either ordered the torture of prisoners or drafted laws that legitimated its use. The charges based on breaches of the UN Convention against Torture and the German Code of Crimes against International Law.

Rumsfeld's disclosure of the whistleblower's identity during a Senate hearing, despite assurances to Joe Darby of his anonymity led to shunning within the community, harassment and death threats against him and his family, resulting in them being taken into protective custody by the U.S. Army. Darby would come to doubt the unintentionality of his public identification, though Rumsfeld sent him a letter stating there had been no malicious intent, the mention was meant as praise, that Rumsfeld was unaware of Darby's anonymity.

=== Resignation ===
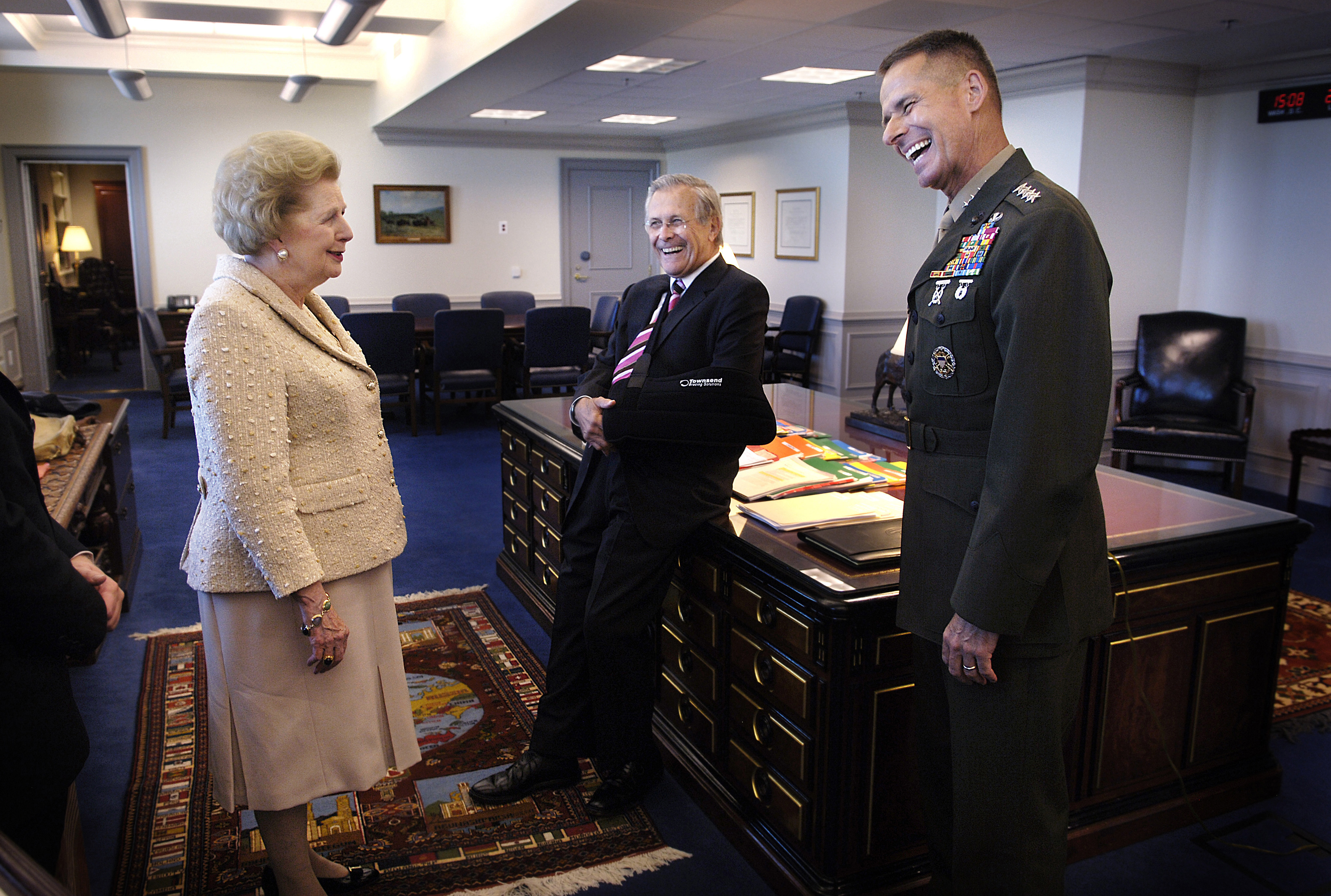
Rumsfeld with former British Prime Minister Margaret Thatcher alongside the Chairman of the Joint Chiefs of Staff General Peter Pace, 2006

Eight U.S. and other NATO-member retired generals and admirals called for Rumsfeld to resign in early 2006 in what was called the "Generals Revolt", accusing him of "abysmal" military planning and lack of strategic competence.

Commentator Pat Buchanan reported at the time that Washington Post columnist David Ignatius, who traveled often to Iraq and supported the war, said the generals "mirror the views of 75 percent of the officers in the field, and probably more". Rumsfeld rebuffed these criticisms, stating, "out of thousands and thousands of admirals and generals, if every time two or three people disagreed we changed the secretary of defense of the United States, it would be like a merry-go-round." Bush defended Rumsfeld throughout and responded by stating that Rumsfeld is "exactly what is needed".

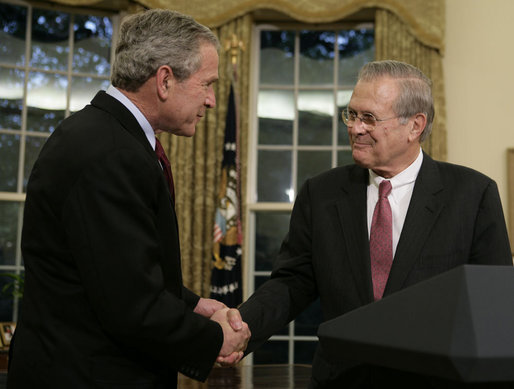
Rumsfeld shakes President Bush's hand as he announces his resignation, November 8, 2006.

On November 1, 2006, Bush stated he would stand by Rumsfeld as defense secretary for the length of his term as president. Rumsfeld wrote a resignation letter dated November 6, 2006, and, per the stamp on the letter, Bush saw it on Election Day, November 7, 2006. In the elections, the House and the Senate shifted to Democratic control. After the elections on November 8, 2006, Bush announced Rumsfeld would resign his position as Secretary of Defense. Many Republicans were unhappy with the delay, believing they would have won more votes if voters had known Rumsfeld was resigning.

Bush nominated Robert Gates to succeed Rumsfeld. On December 15, 2006, a farewell ceremony, with an armed forces full honor review and a 19-gun salute, was held at the Pentagon Mall Terrace in honor of the departing Rumsfeld.

== Retirement and later life (2006–2021) ==
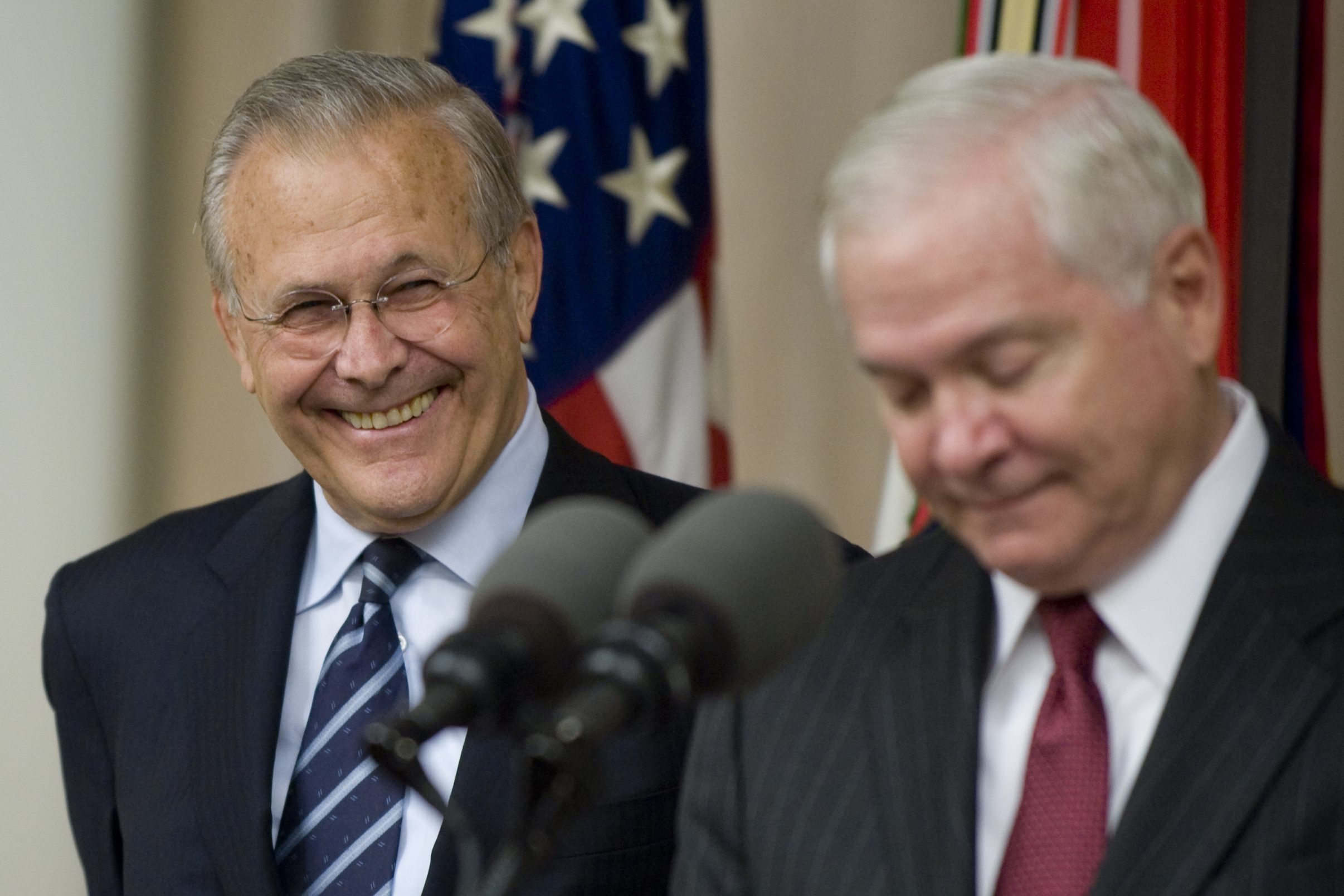
Rumsfeld shares a laugh with his successor, Robert Gates, at a ceremony to unveil his official portrait as Secretary of Defense, June 25, 2010.

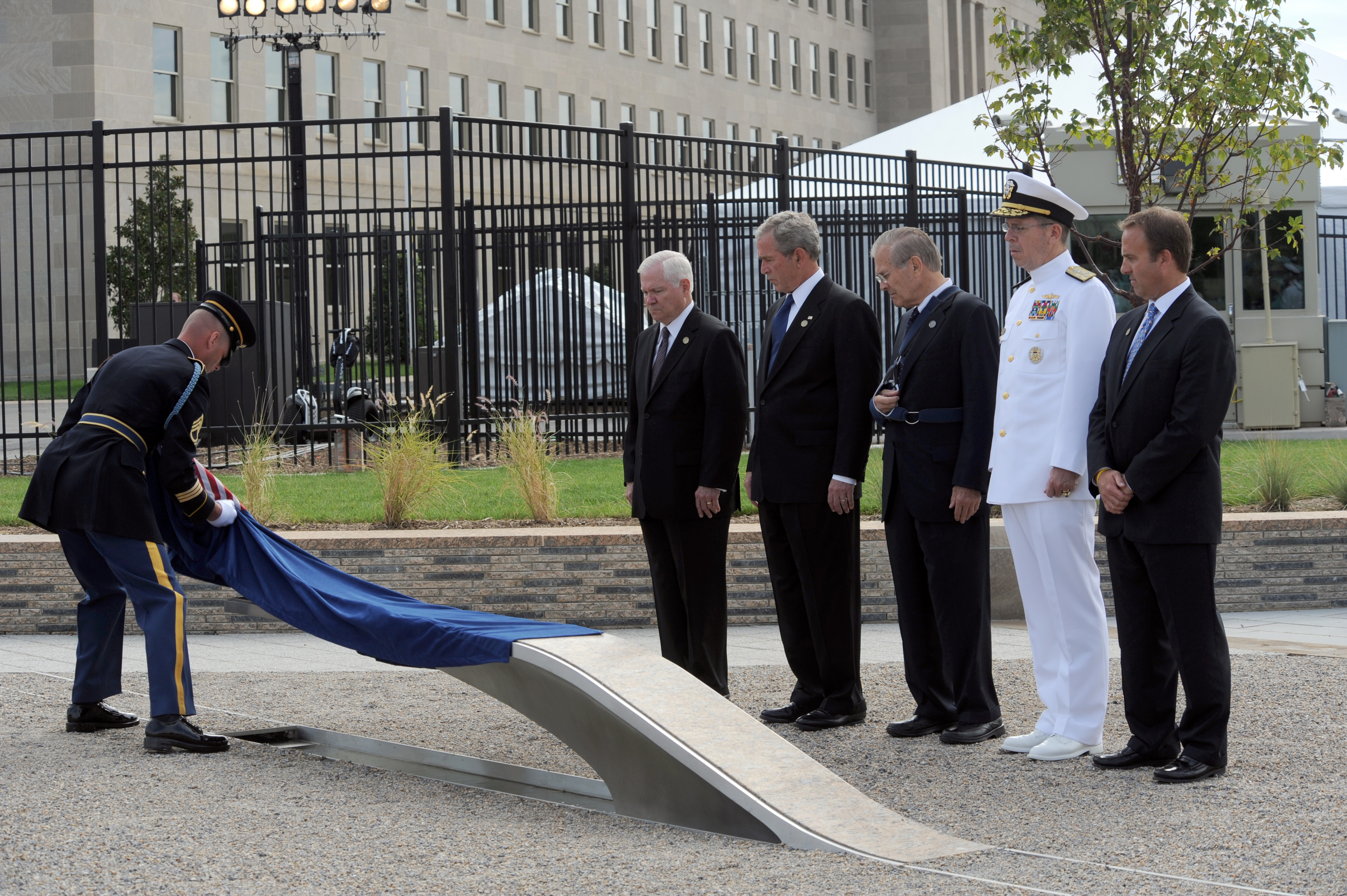
Dedication ceremony of the Pentagon Memorial in 2008

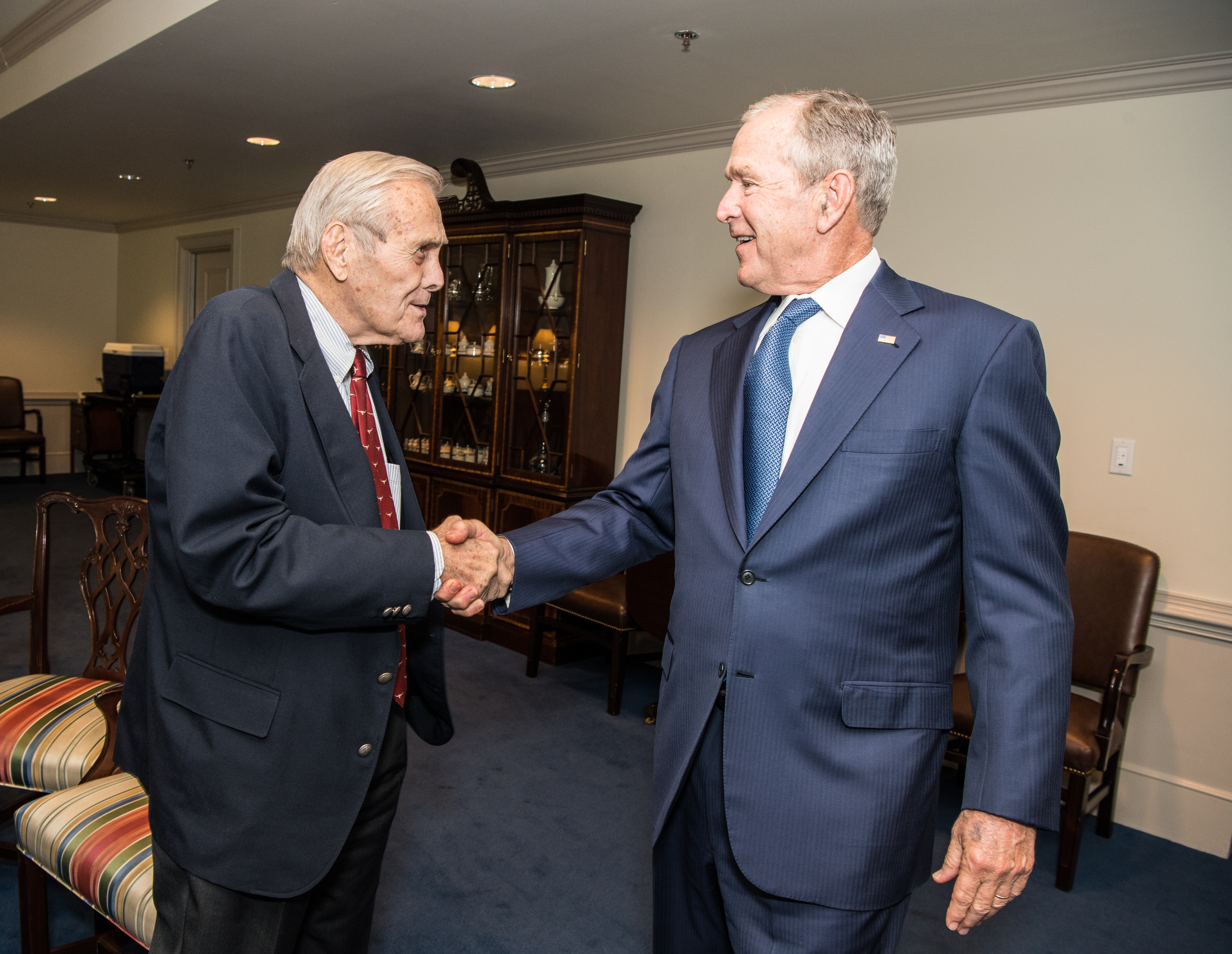
Rumsfeld greeting former president George W. Bush in 2019

In the months after his resignation, Rumsfeld toured the New York City publishing houses in preparation for a potential memoir. After receiving what one industry source labeled "big bids", he reached an agreement with the Penguin Group to publish the book under its Sentinel HC imprint. Rumsfeld declined to accept an advance for the publication of his memoir, and said he was donating all proceeds from the work to veterans groups. His book, entitled Known and Unknown: A Memoir, was released on February 8, 2011.

In conjunction with the publication of Known and Unknown, Rumsfeld established "The Rumsfeld Papers", a website with documents "related to the endnotes" of the book and his service during the George W. Bush administration; during the months that followed the book's publication, the website was expanded to include over 4,000 documents from his archive. As of June 2011, the topics included his Congressional voting record, the Nixon administration, documents and memos of meetings while he was part of the Ford, Reagan, and George W. Bush administrations, private sector documents, and NATO documents, among other items.

In 2007, Rumsfeld established The Rumsfeld Foundation, which focuses on encouraging public service in the United States and supporting the growth of free political and free economic systems abroad. The educational foundation provides fellowships to talented individuals from the private sector who want to serve for some time in government. Rumsfeld personally financed the foundation. As of January 2014, the foundation had sponsored over 90 fellows from Central Asia, provided over $1.2 million in tuition and stipend support for graduate students, awarded over $3 million in microfinance grants, and donated over $2.4 million to charities for veterans' affairs. On January 3, 2007, Rumsfeld, along with Bush, Senate Majority Leader Harry Reid, Governor of Michigan Jennifer Granholm and Mayor of Grand Rapids George Heartwell, spoke at Ford's Grand Rapids funeral service. Rumsfeld then accompanied the Ford and Bush families to the burial at the Gerald R. Ford Presidential Museum.

Rumsfeld was awarded the "Defender of the Constitution Award" at the 2011 Conservative Political Action Conference in Washington, D.C., on February 10, 2011.

After his retirement from government, Rumsfeld criticized former fellow Cabinet member Condoleezza Rice, Secretary of State, in his memoir, asserting that she was basically unfit for office. In 2011, she responded, saying that Rumsfeld "doesn't know what he's talking about. The reader may imagine what can be correct about the conflicted matter."

In February 2011, Rumsfeld endorsed the repeal of the military's "Don't ask, don't tell" policy, saying that allowing gays and lesbians to openly serve "is an idea whose time has come".

In March 2011, Rumsfeld spoke out on the 2011 military intervention in Libya, telling ABC News Senior White House Correspondent Jake Tapper that the Obama administration should "recognize the mission has to determine the coalition. The coalition ought not determine the mission." Rumsfeld also used the word "confusion" six times to describe the United Nations-backed military effort in Libya.

In October 2011, Rumsfeld conducted an interview with Al Jazeera's Washington, D.C., bureau chief Abderrahim Foukara. Foukara asked Rumsfeld whether, in hindsight, the Bush administration had sent enough troops into Iraq to secure the borders of the country, and whether that made the United States culpable in the death of innocent Iraqis. Foukara said people in the Pentagon told Rumsfeld the number of troops sent into Iraq was insufficient. Rumsfeld said, "You keep making assertions which are fundamentally false. No one in the Pentagon said they were not enough." Foukara pressed Rumsfeld repeatedly. Rumsfeld then asked, "Do you want to yell or do you want to have an interview?" Foukara then asked, "Do you think the numbers that you went to Iraq with did absolve you from the responsibility of tens, maybe hundreds of thousands of innocent Iraqis killed by the Coalition and those criminals that you talked about?" Rumsfeld called the question "pejorative" and said Foukara was "not being respectful" (Foukara disagreed) and was "just talking over, and over, and over again".

Rumsfeld was the subject of the 2013 Errol Morris documentary The Unknown Known, the title a reference to his response to a question at a February 2002 press conference. In the film Rumsfeld "discusses his career in Washington D.C. from his days as a congressman in the early 1960s to planning the invasion of Iraq in 2003".

In January 2016, in partnership with the literary and creative agency Javelin, which handled design and development, Rumsfeld released a mobile app game of solitaire called Churchill Solitaire, emulating a variant of the card game as played by Winston Churchill.

In June 2016, Rumsfeld announced that he would vote for Donald Trump in the 2016 presidential election.

On January 5, 2021, Rumsfeld was one of the ten living former Secretaries of Defense that sent a warning letter in order to warn President Trump not to involve the military in a 2020 presidential election dispute.

== Death ==
On June 29, 2021, Rumsfeld died from multiple myeloma at his home in Taos, New Mexico, aged 88. Following a private funeral at Fort Myer, he was buried in Arlington National Cemetery on August 24, 2021.

== Electoral history ==
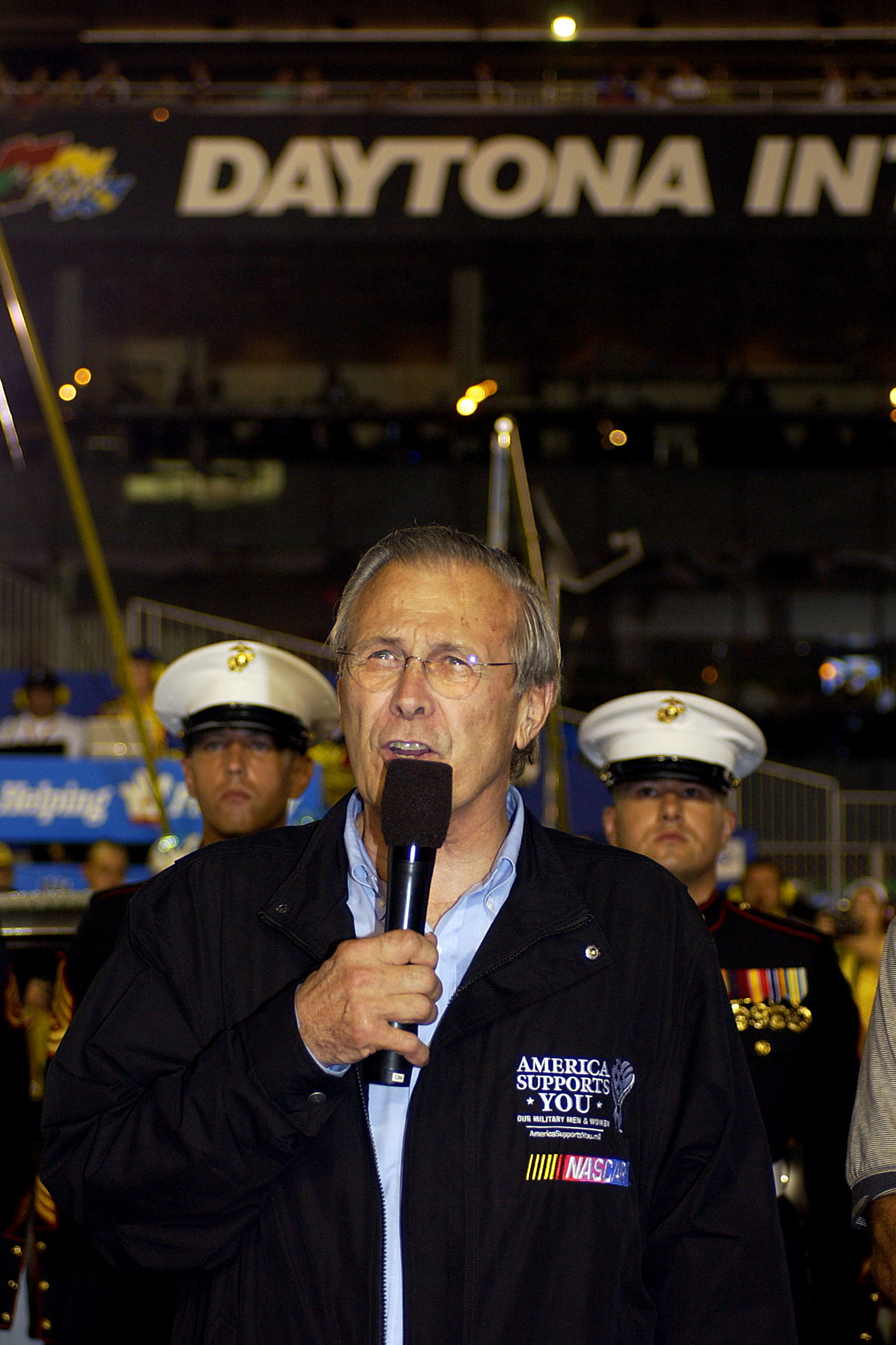
Rumsfeld gives the command at the 2005 Pepsi 400, where he served as the grand marshal.

During the four elections during which he ran to represent Illinois's 13th congressional district, Rumsfeld received shares of the popular vote that ranged from 58% (in 1964) to 76% (in 1966). In 1975 and 2001, Rumsfeld was overwhelmingly confirmed by the U.S. Senate after presidents Gerald Ford and George W. Bush, respectively, appointed him as U.S. Secretary of Defense.

== Awards ==
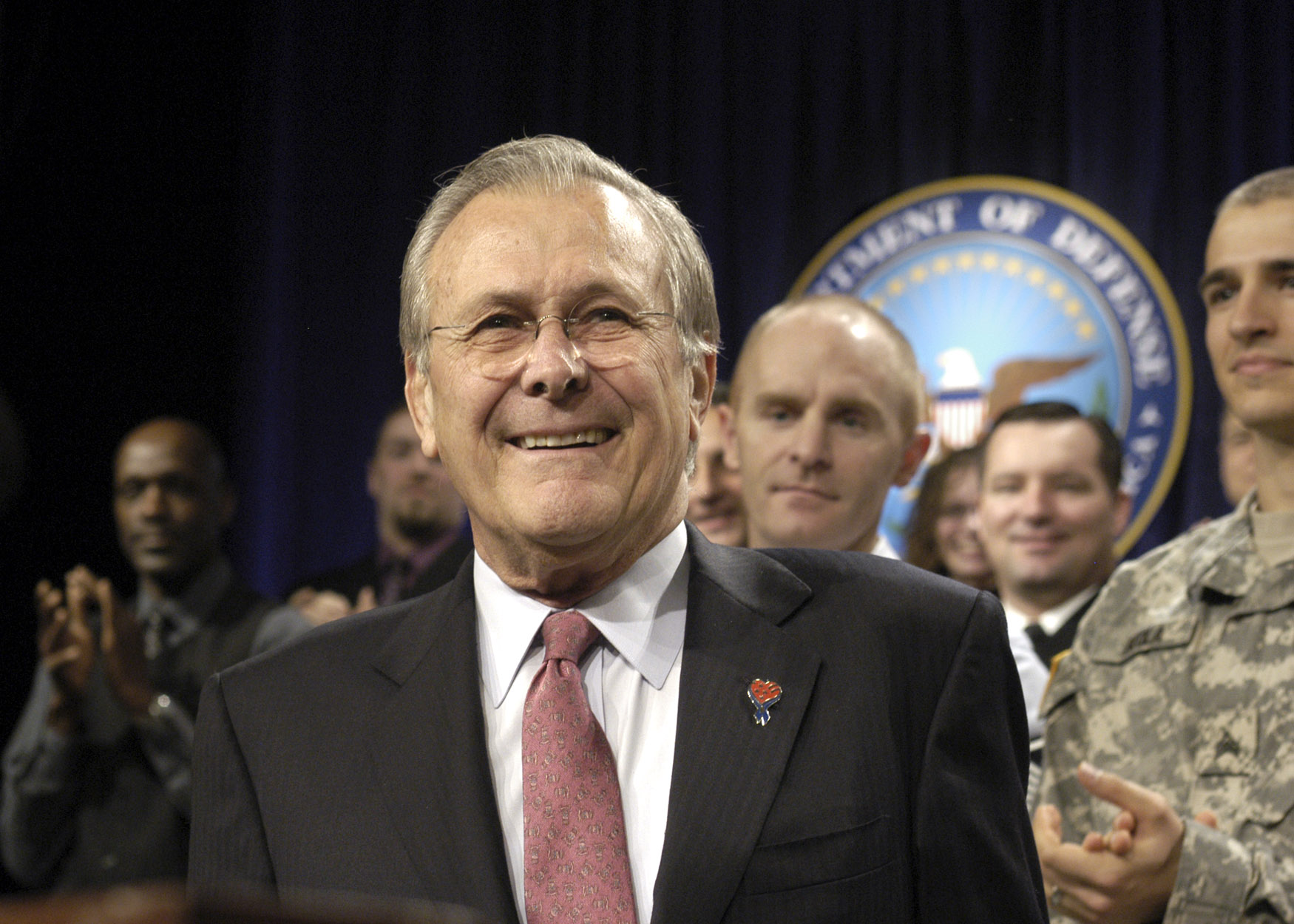
Rumsfeld in the Pentagon auditorium for his final meeting with Pentagon employees, December 8, 2006

Rumsfeld was awarded 11 honorary degrees. Following his years as CEO, president, and later chairman of G. D. Searle & Company, he was recognized as Outstanding CEO in the pharmaceutical industry by The Wall Street Transcript (1980) and Financial World (1981).

Some of his other awards included:

- All Navy Wrestling Champion (1956)
- Golden Plate Award of the American Academy of Achievement (1983)
- George C. Marshall Medal by the Association of the U.S. Army (1984)
- Woodrow Wilson Medal by Princeton University (1985)
- Dwight D. Eisenhower Medal (1993)
- Lone Sailor Award by the U.S. Navy Memorial Foundation (2002)
- Statesmanship Award by the United States Association of Former Members of Congress (2003)
- Ronald Reagan Freedom Award (2003)
- James H. Doolittle Award by the Hudson Institute (2003)
- Gerald R. Ford Medal presented by President Ford and the Ford Foundation (2004)
- Distinguished Eagle Scout Award by the Boy Scouts of America (1976)
- Golden Raspberry Award for Worst Supporting Actor (2004) for his appearance in Fahrenheit 9/11
- Union League of Philadelphia Gold Medal for Citizenship (2006)
- Claremont Institute Statesmanship Award (2007)
- Victory of Freedom Award from the Richard Nixon Foundation (2010)
- Order of Anthony Wayne from Valley Forge Military Academy
- National Flag award from Albania's President Bujar Nishani (2013)

== Honors ==
Ribbon	Country	Honour	Year
Presidential Medal of Freedom with Distinction (ribbon)	United States	Presidential Medal of Freedom	1977
JPN Kyokujitsu-sho 1Class BAR	Japan	Grand Cordon of the Order of the Rising Sun	2015
Spange des König-Abdulaziz-Ordens	KSA	Grand Cordon of the Order of King Abdulaziz	2002
POL Order Zaslugi RP kl1 BAR	Poland	Grand Cross of the Order of Merit of the Republic of Poland	2005
Order of the Star of Romania - Ribbon bar	Romania	Grand Officer of the Order of the Star of Romania	2004
D-HAN-B-Order-Ernest-August BAR	Rwanda	Medal of the Royal Order of the Lion	2007
TWN Order of Brilliant Star 1Class BAR	Taiwan	Grand Cordon of the Order of Brilliant Star	2011

== Legacy and reputation ==
Secretary of State Henry Kissinger described Rumsfeld as "the most ruthless man" he knew. George Packer of The Atlantic named Rumsfeld "the worst secretary of defense in American history" who "lacked the wisdom to change his mind." Bradley Graham, a Washington Post reporter and author of the book titled By His Own Rules: The Ambitions, Successes, and Ultimate Failures of Donald Rumsfeld released on June 23, 2009, stated "Rumsfeld left office as one of the most controversial Defense Secretaries since Robert McNamara and widely criticized for his management of the Iraq war and for his difficult relationships with Congress, administration colleagues, and military officers." Neoconservative commentator Bill Kristol was also critical of Rumsfeld, stating he "breezily dodged responsibility" for planning mistakes made in the Iraq War, including insufficient troop levels. In Jon Meacham's book Destiny and Power: The American Odyssey of George Herbert Walker Bush, published in November 2015, the 41st president George H. W. Bush was critical of Rumsfeld and called Rumsfeld "an arrogant fellow" and "I think he served the president badly," and "I don't like what he did, and I think it hurt the president having his iron-ass view of everything."

Rumsfeld is one of the main characters in Andrew Satio's play, Mount Misery: A Comedy of Enhanced Interrogations. The play involves Rumsfeld and Frederick Douglass based on the former's purchase of Mount Misery, the plantation owned by Edward Covey where Douglass was sent as a slave.

== Affiliation history ==
=== Institutional affiliations ===
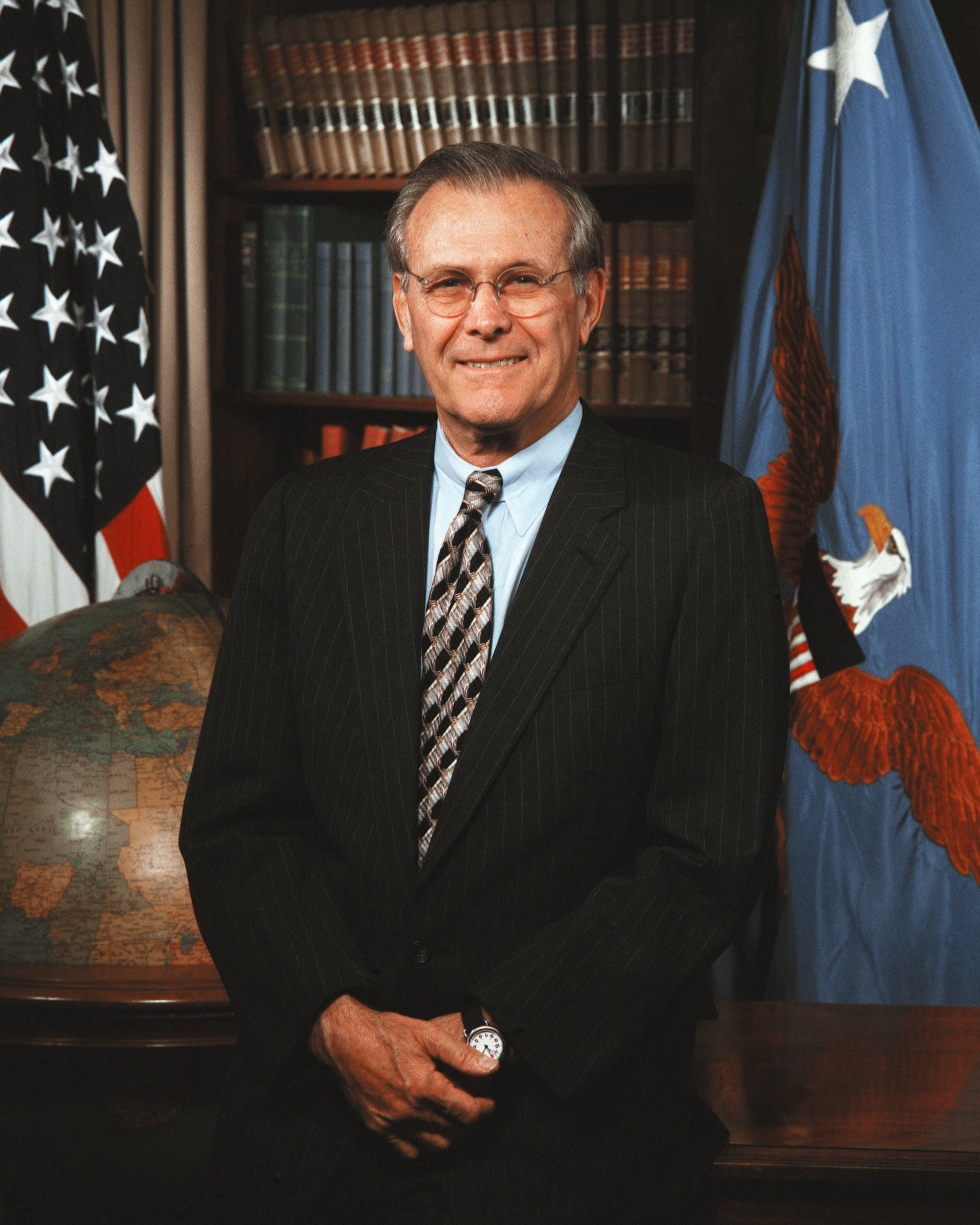
Rumsfeld's official portrait in 2001

- Center for Security Policy: longtime associate; winner of the CSP's 1998 "Keeper of the Flame" award (5)
- Hoover Institution: former member, board of trustees
- Project for the New American Century: signed PNAC's founding statement of principles as well as two policy letters on Iraq
- Freedom House: former board member
- RAND Corporation: former chairman
- Committee for the Free World: former chairman
- National Park Foundation: former member
- Eisenhower Exchange Fellowships: former chairman
- Le Cercle: member
- Bohemian Club: member
- Alfalfa Club: member
- National Academy of Public Administration: member

=== Government posts, panels, and commissions ===
- Secretary of Defense (2001–06)
- U.S. Commission to Assess National Security Space Management and Organization: chairman (2000)
- U.S. Trade Deficit Reviews Commission: member (1999–2000)
- Commission to Assess the Ballistic Missile Threat to the United States: chairman (1998)
- National Commission on Public Service: member (1987–1990)
- National Economic Commission: member (1988–1989)
- President Reagan's General Advisory Committee on Arms Control: member (1982–1986)
- U.S. Joint Advisory Commission on U.S./Japan Relations: member (1983–1984)
- Presidential Envoy to the Middle East, Reagan administration (1983–1984)
- Presidential Envoy on the Law of the Sea Treaty, Reagan administration (1982–1983)
- Secretary of Defense (1975–77)
- White House Chief of Staff in Ford administration (1974–75)
- U.S. Ambassador to NATO (1973–74)
- U.S. Congress: Representative from Illinois (1962–69)
- United States Navy: Various posts, including aviator (1954–57); reserves (1957–1975); retired as a navy captain (1989)

=== Corporate connections and business interests ===
- Eastern Air Lines: former director – The annual reports of Eastern Air Lines disclose that Donald Rumsfeld was a member of Eastern Air Lines board of directors.
- Gilead Sciences: Joined Gilead as a director in 1988, chairman (1997–2001)
- General Instrument: chairman and CEO (1990–93)
- G. D. Searle & Company: CEO/chairman/president (1977–1985)
- Gulfstream Aerospace: director
- Tribune Company: director
- Metricom: director
- Sears: director
- ABB: director
- Kellogg's: director 1985–1999 while Carlos Gutierrez (ex Cuba 1960) was president, CEO and chairman of Kellogg until named Secretary of Commerce under Bush from 2005.
- RAND Corporation: chairman of the board from 1981 to 1986; 1995–1996
- Amylin Pharmaceuticals: director
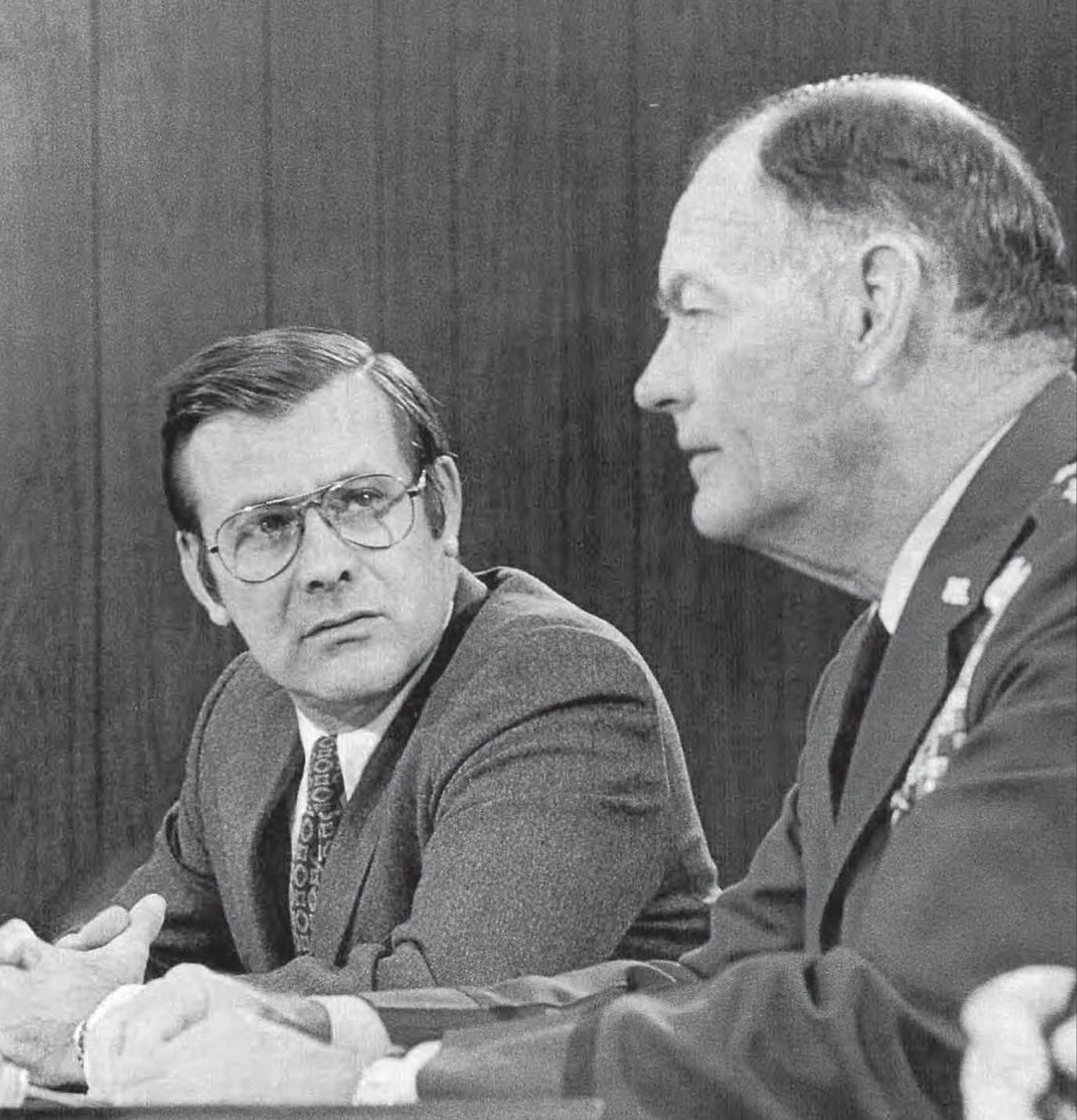
Secretary of Defense Donald Rumsfeld and Chairman of the Joint Chiefs of Staff General George S. Brown at The Pentagon, January 15, 1976

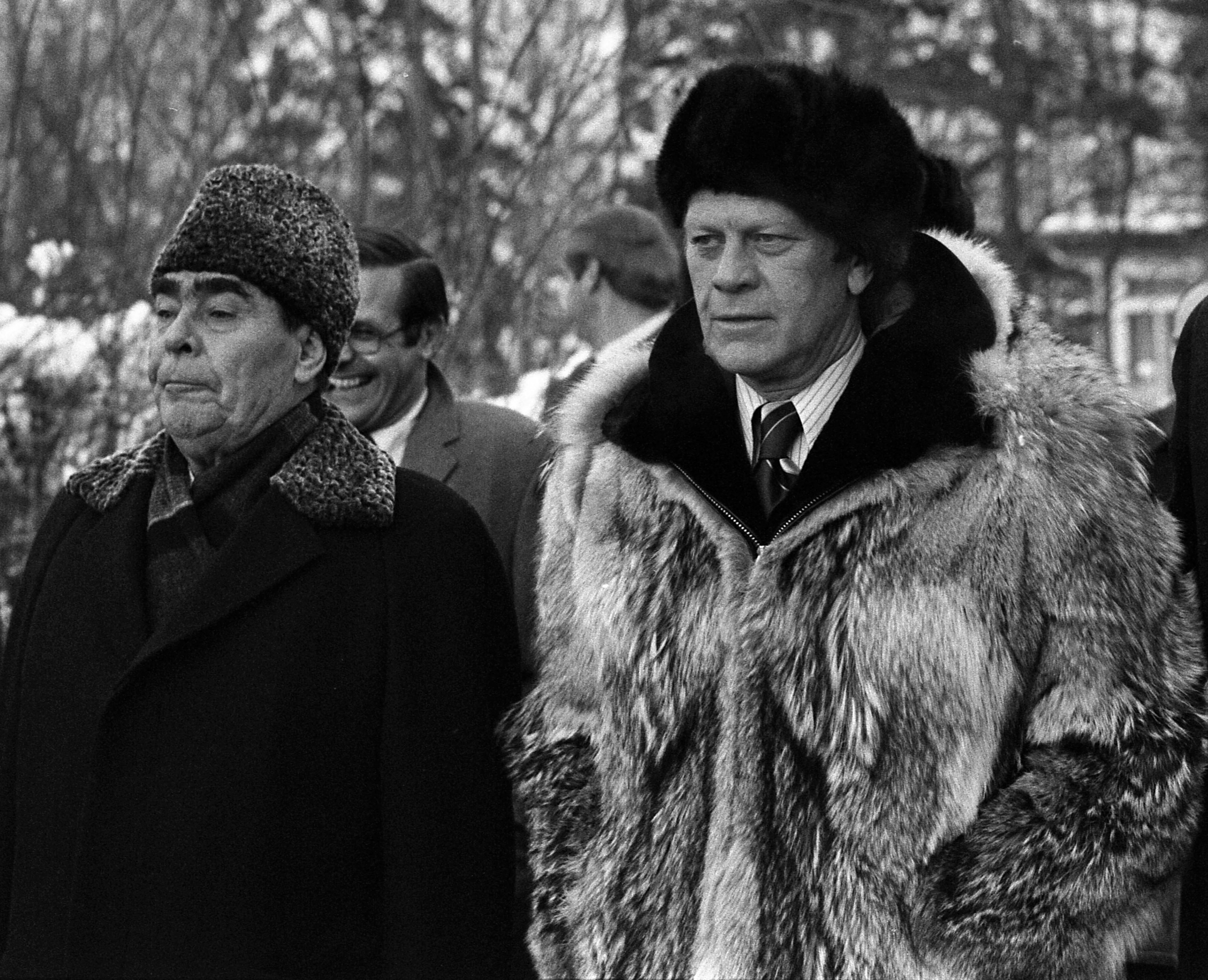
Soviet leader Leonid Brezhnev, President Ford and Rumsfeld in Vladivostok, Russian SFSR, Soviet Union, November 1974

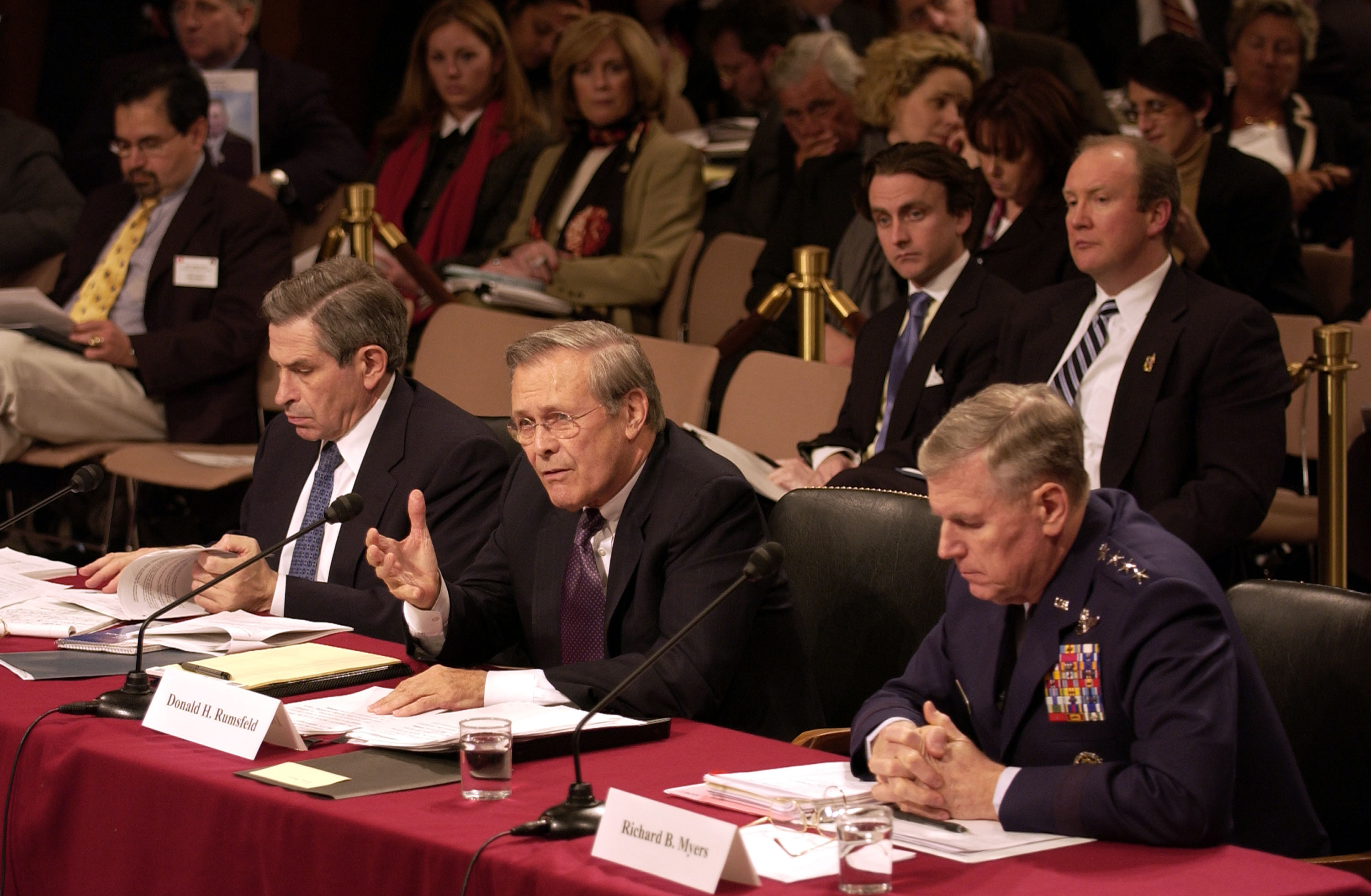
Secretary of Defense Donald Rumsfeld with Chairman of The Joint Chiefs of Staff General Richard B. Myers and Deputy Secretary of Defense Paul Wolfowitz testifying before the 9/11 Commission in March 2004

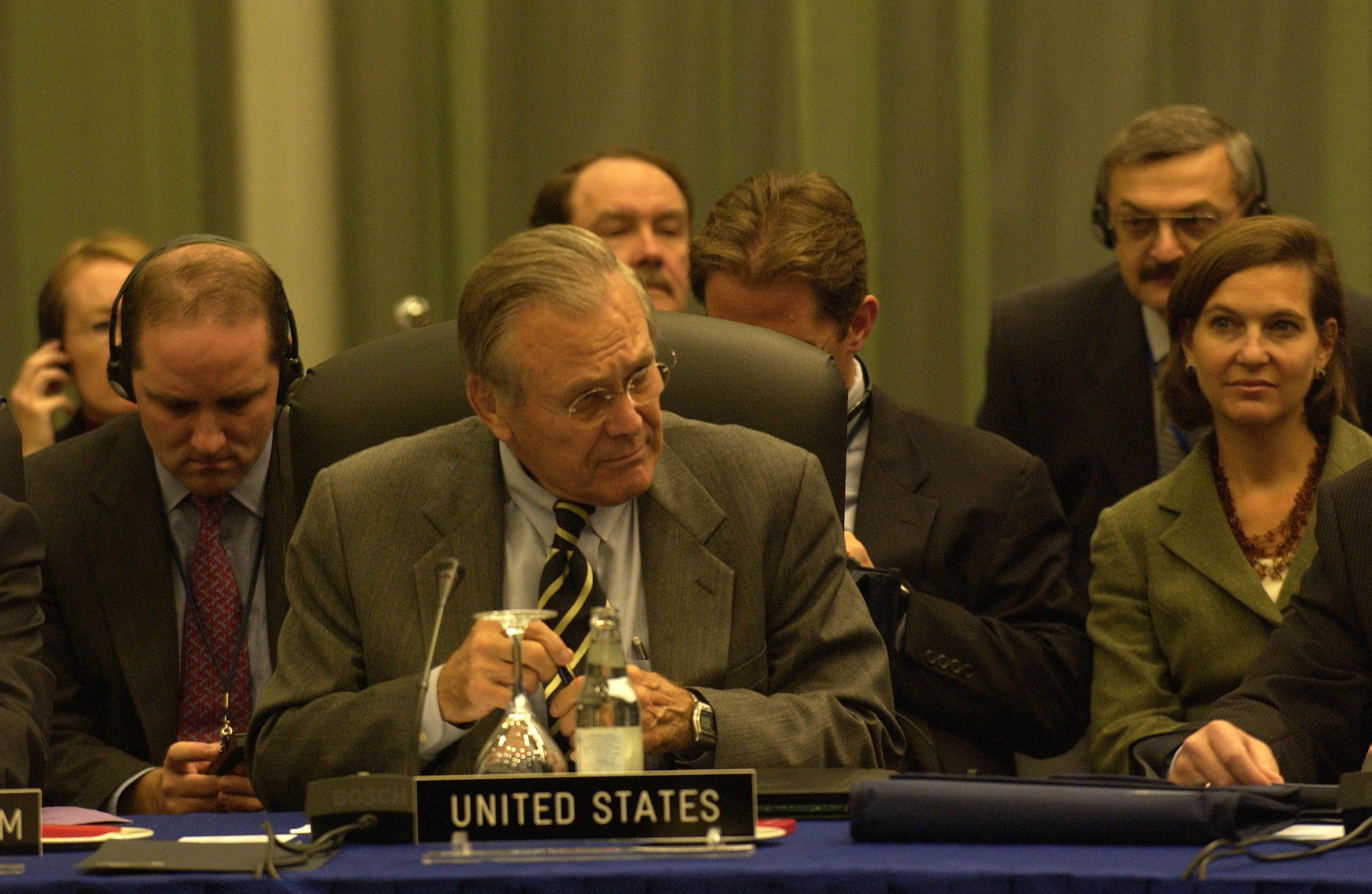
Rumsfeld and Victoria Nuland at the NATO-Ukraine consultations in Vilnius, Lithuania, on October 24, 2005

=== Education ===
- Princeton University: A.B. (1954)

== Gallery ==
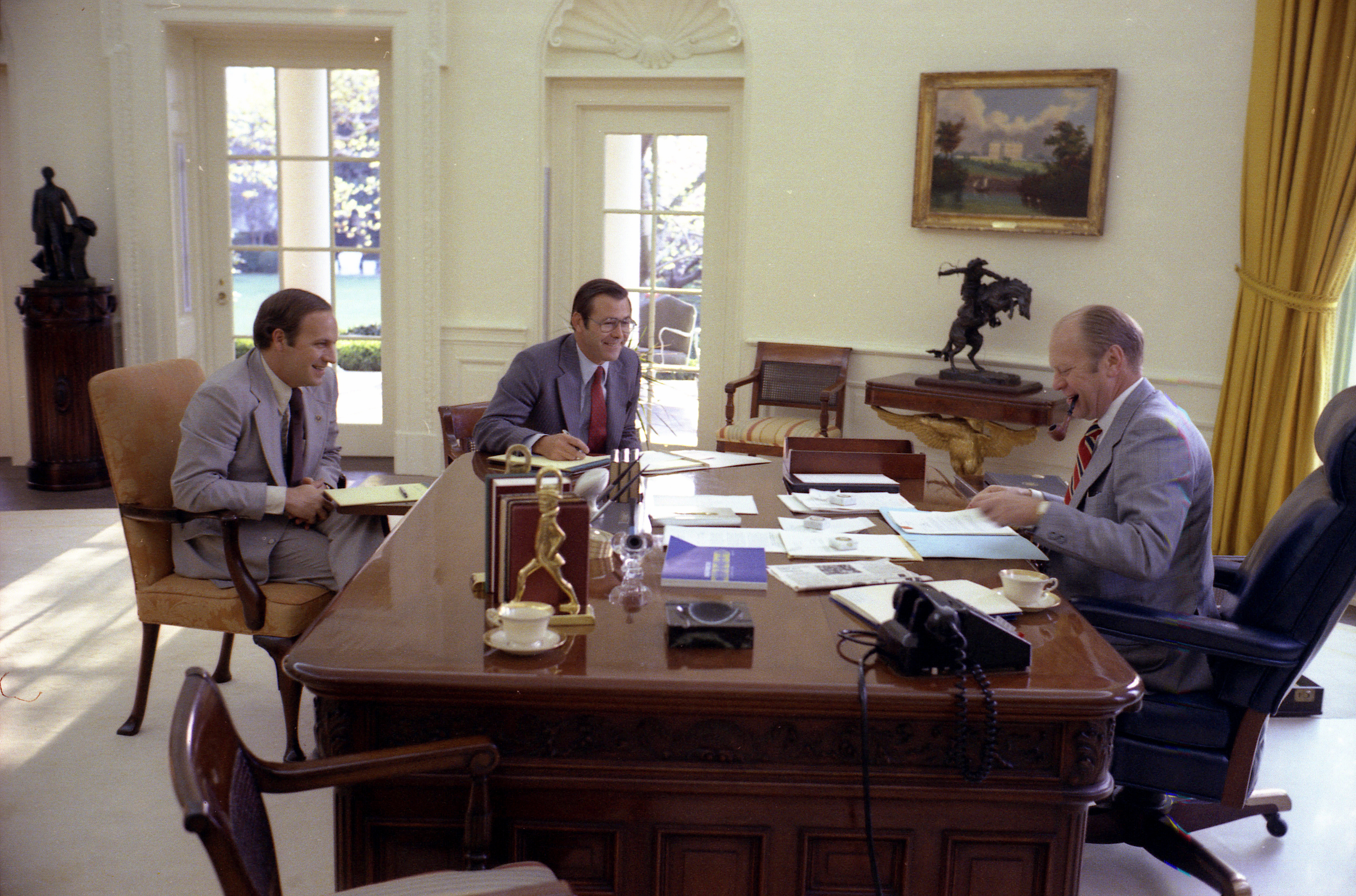
Rumsfeld and Cheney with President Ford at The Oval Office

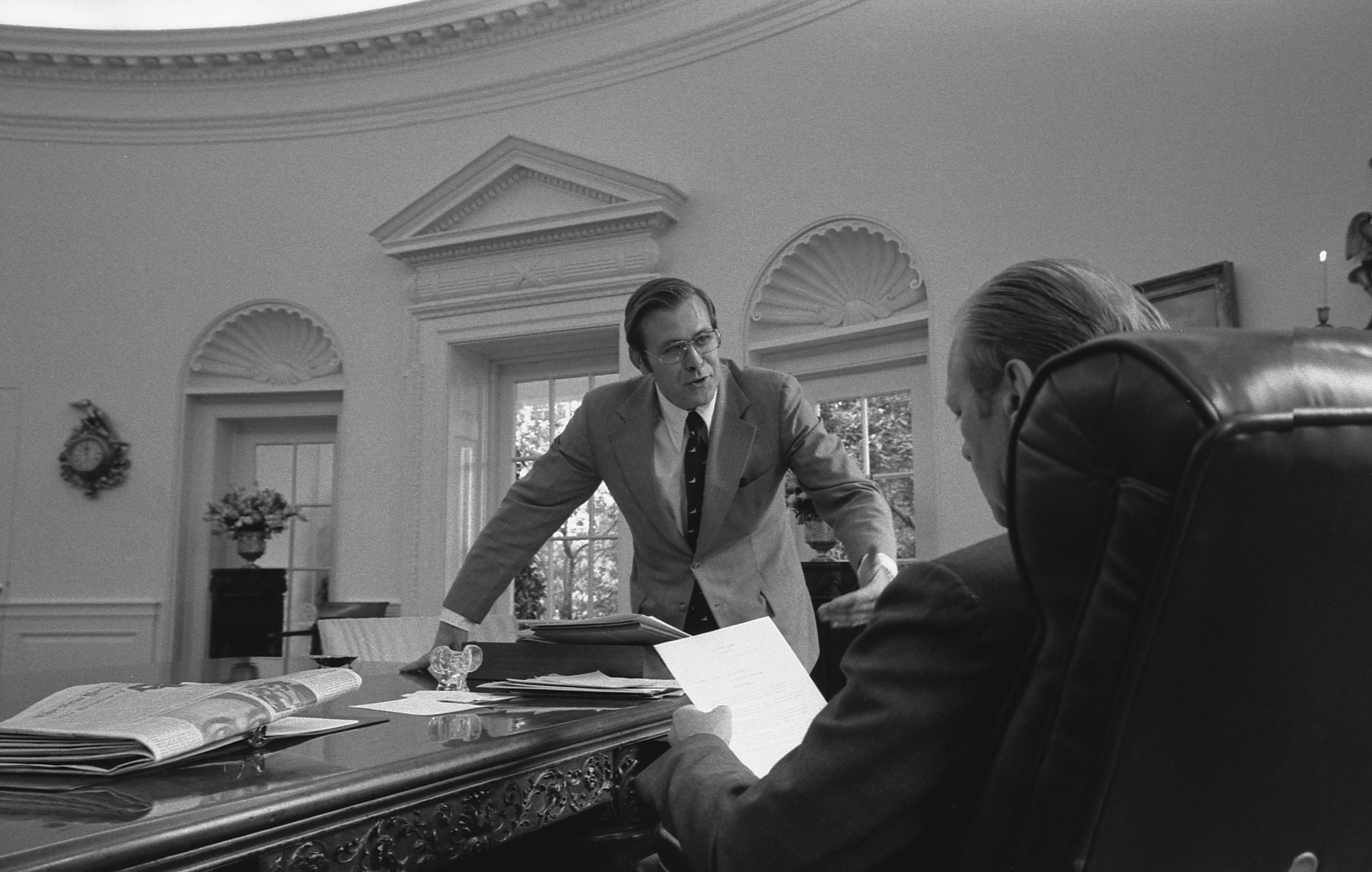
White House Chief of Staff Donald Rumsfeld with President Gerald Ford at the Oval Office, White House

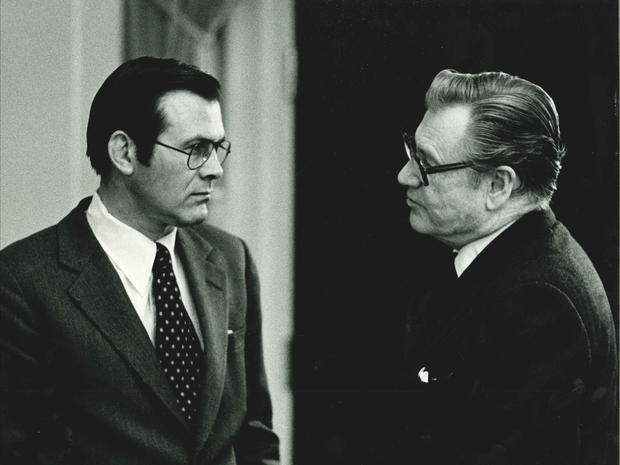
Secretary of Defense Donald Rumsfeld with Vice President Nelson Rockefeller in 1976

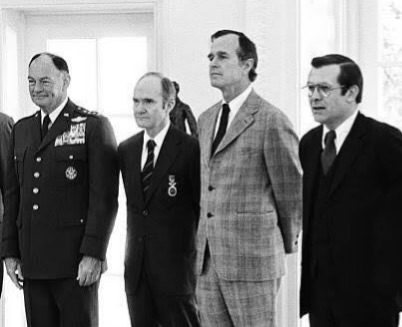
Secretary of Defense Donald Rumsfeld with Chairman of The Joint Chiefs of Staff General George S. Brown, National Security Advisor Lieutenant General Brent Scowcroft, and C.I.A. Director George H. W. Bush at The Oval Office, White House, March 11, 1976

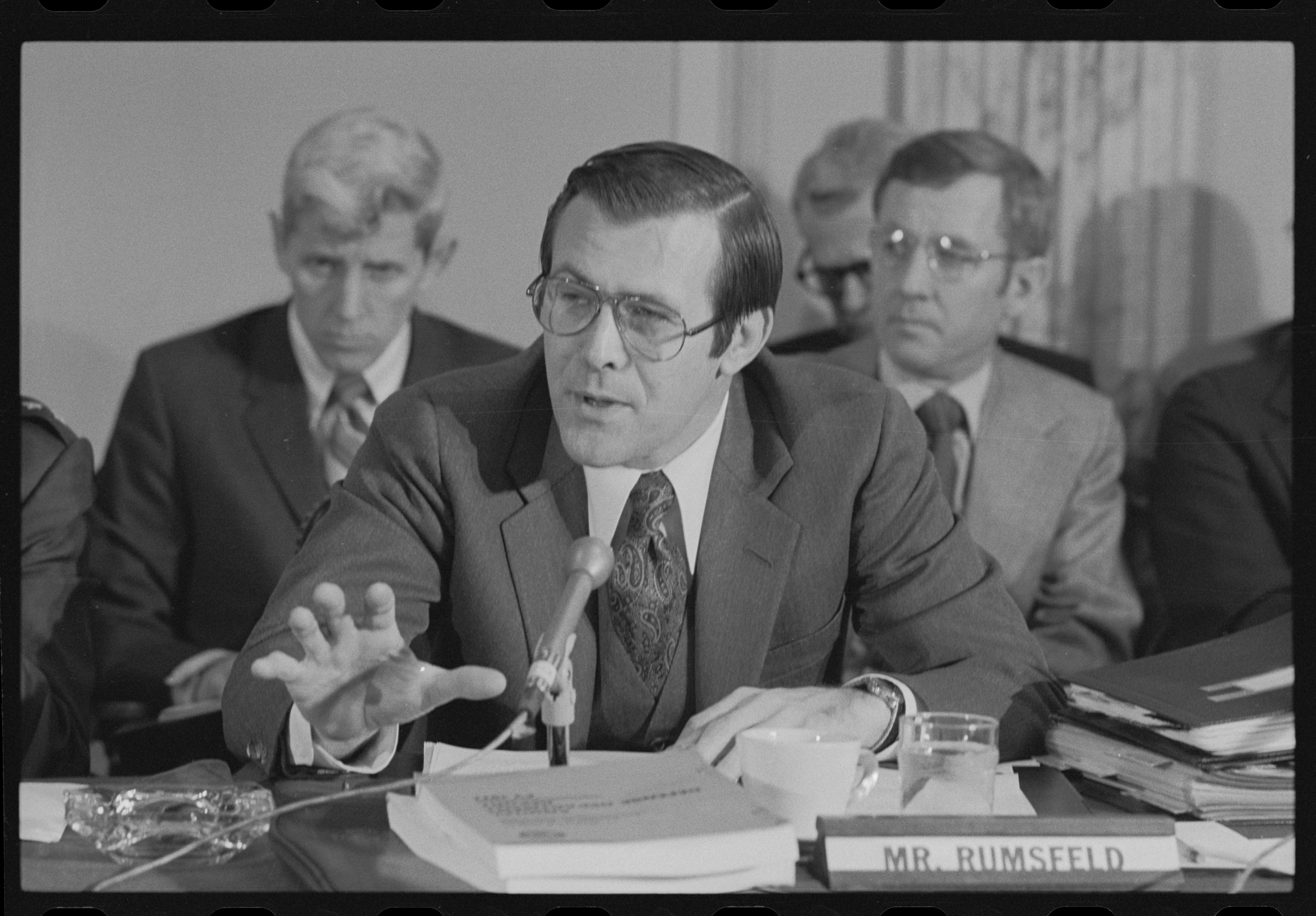
Secretary of Defense Donald Rumsfeld testifying at Senate Armed Services Committee hearing on the Defense Department budget on March 9, 1976

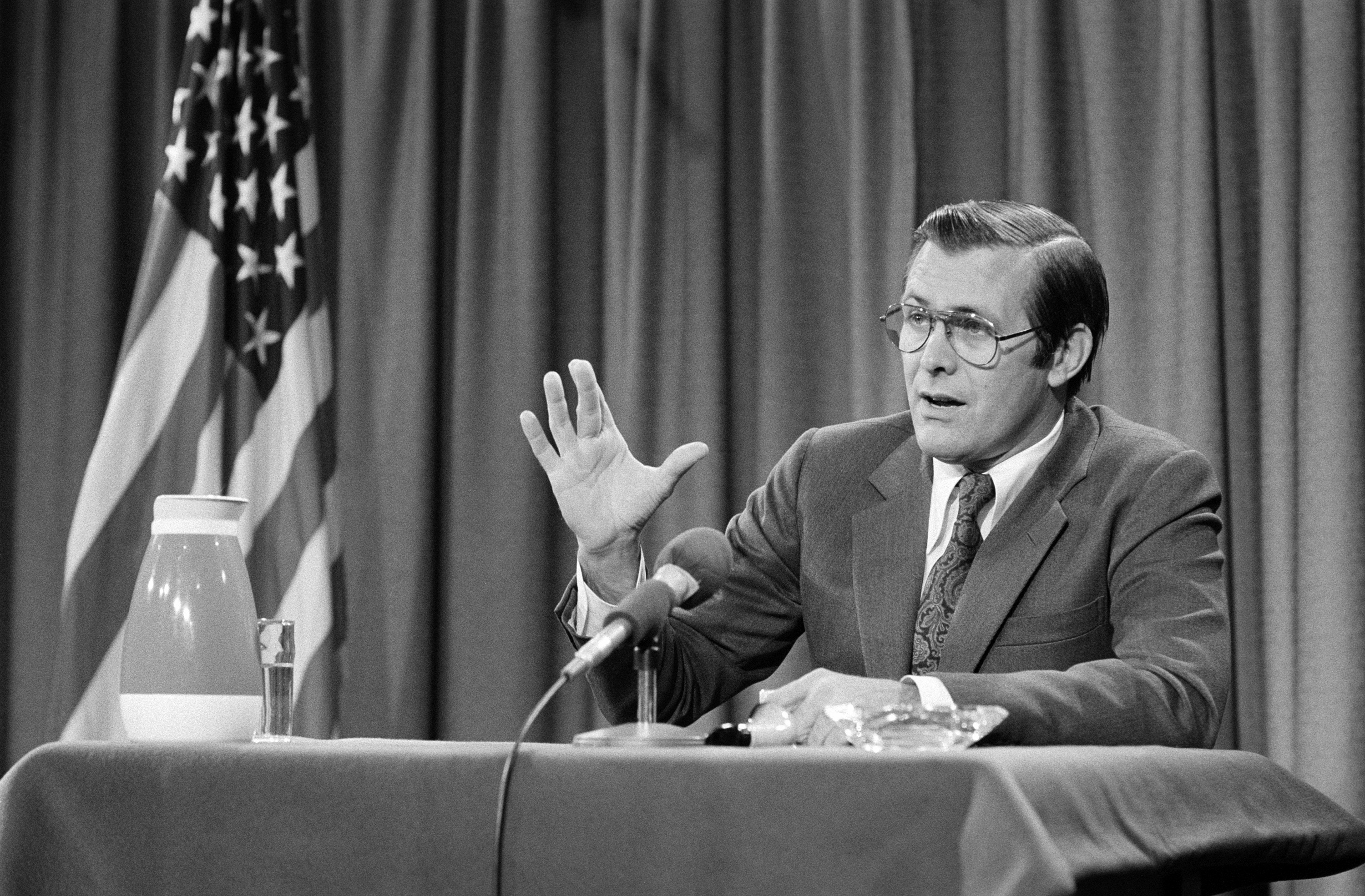
Secretary of Defense Donald Rumsfeld speaking during a press conference at The Pentagon on October 6, 1976

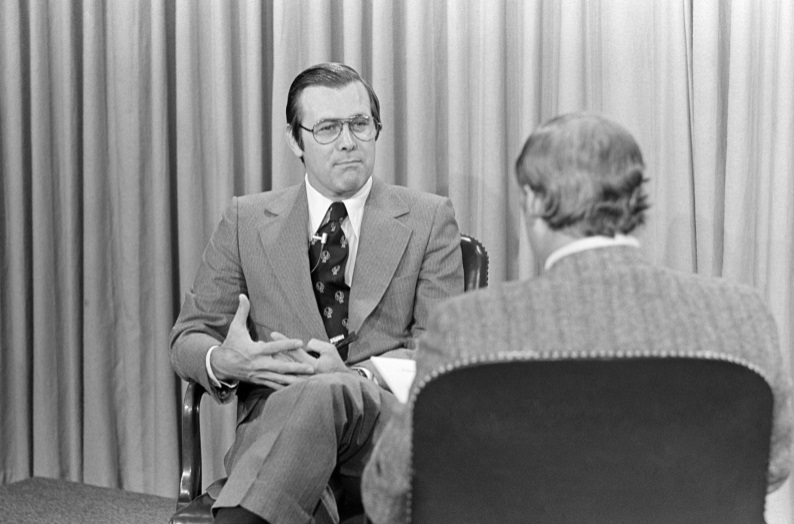
Secretary of Defense Donald Rumsfeld during an Interview with WMAL-TV reporter Jim Clark at The Pentagon Studio on November 4, 1976

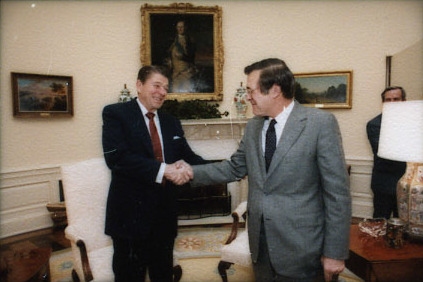
Donald Rumsfeld with President Ronald Reagan at The Oval Office in 1983

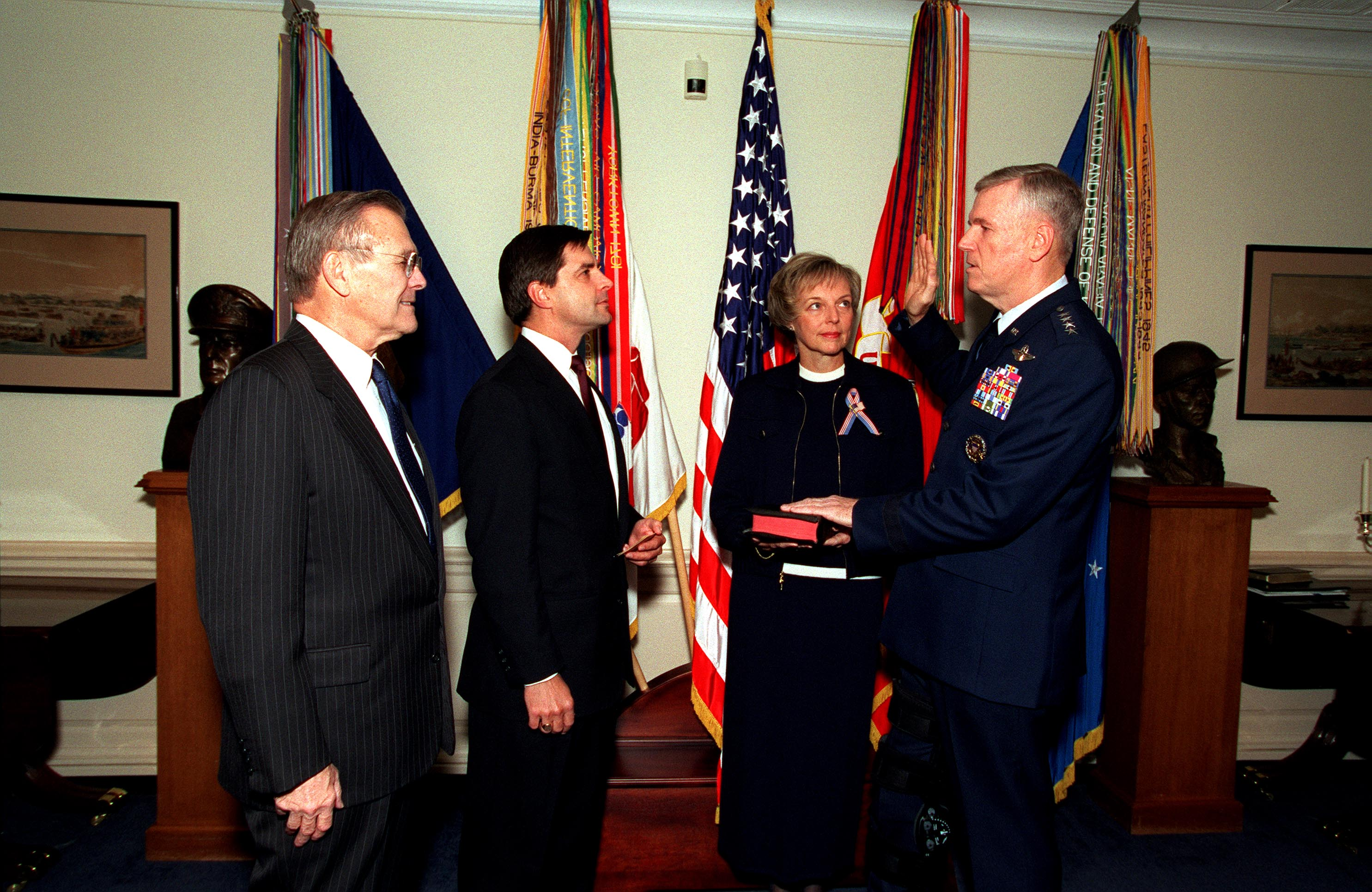
Secretary of Defense Donald Rumsfeld watches as General Richard B. Myers was sworn in as the 15th Chairman of the Joint Chiefs of Staff, October 1, 2001.

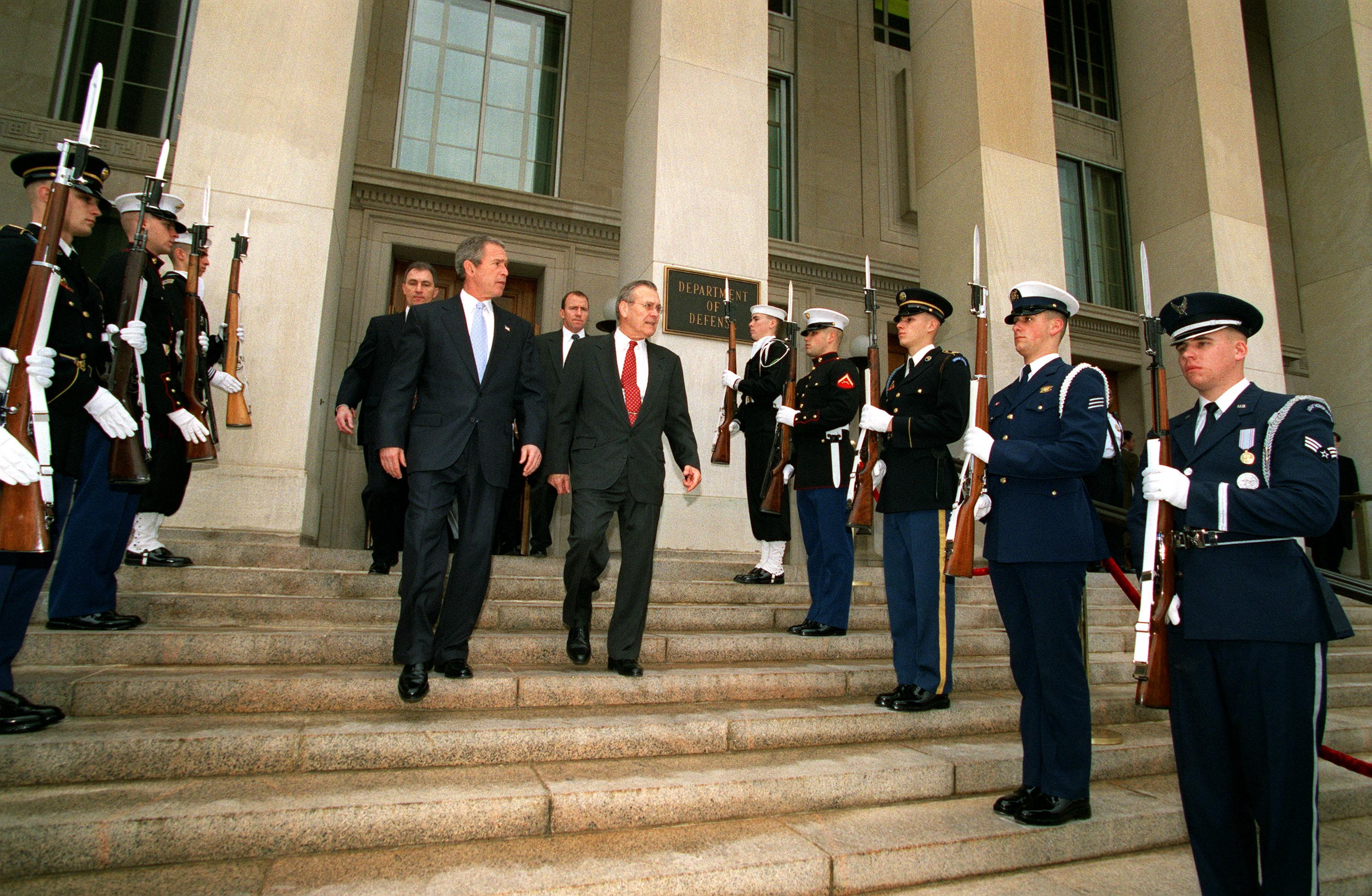
Secretary of Defense Donald Rumsfeld with President George W. Bush, following President Bush's visit to The Pentagon to address military and Department of Defense personnel and sign the Defense Appropriations Bill, January 10, 2002

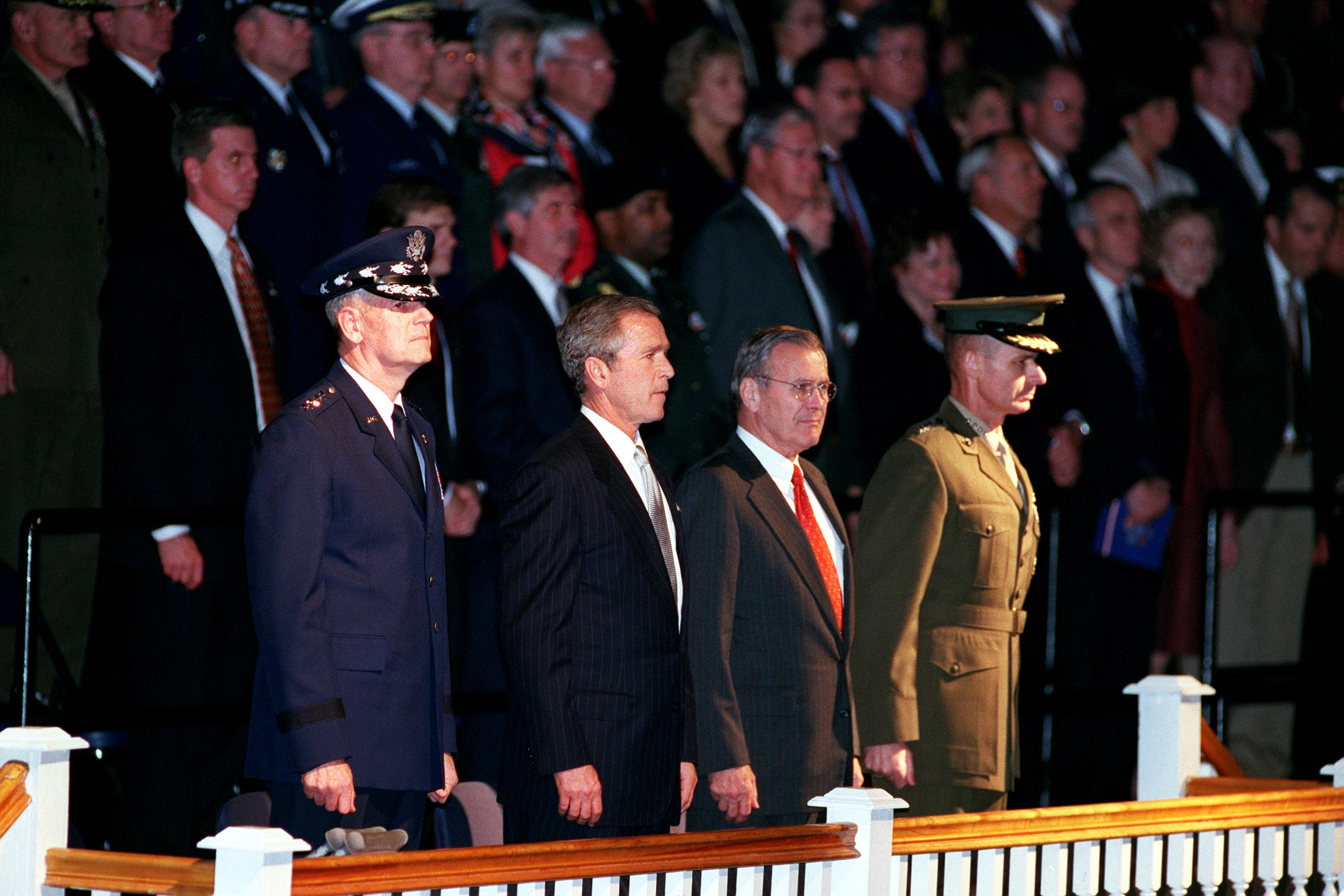
Secretary of Defense Donald Rumsfeld, President George W. Bush, Chairman of The Joint Chiefs of Staff General Richard B. Myers, and Vice Chairman of The Joint Chiefs of Staff General Peter Pace watch troops pass in review at Fort Myer, Virginia, on October 15, 2001.

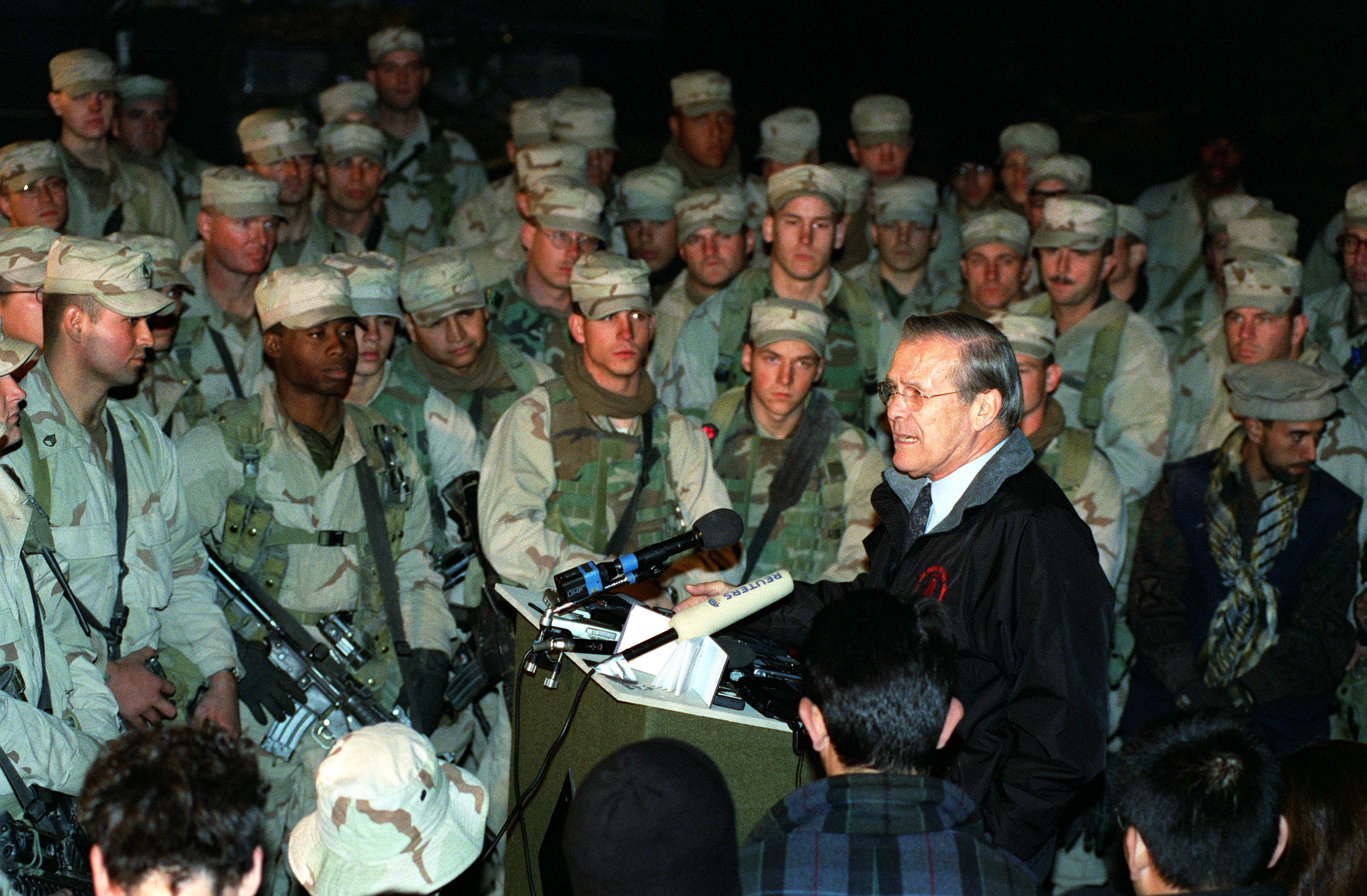
U.S. Secretary of Defense Donald Rumsfeld with troops at Bagram Air Base, December 2001

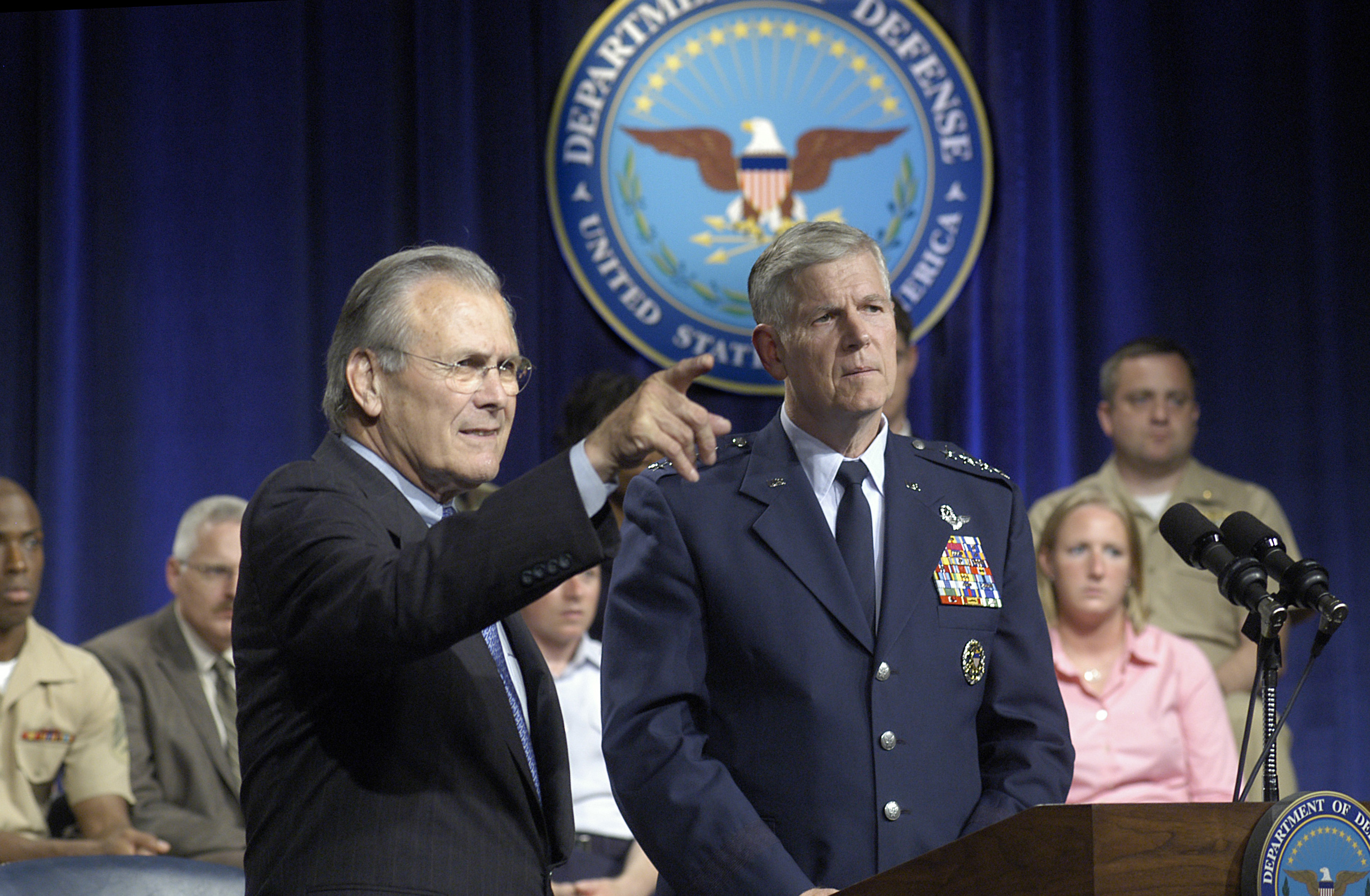
Secretary of Defense Donald Rumsfeld with Chairman of the Joint Chiefs of Staff General Richard B. Myers during the annual Pentagon Town Hall meeting at The Pentagon auditorium

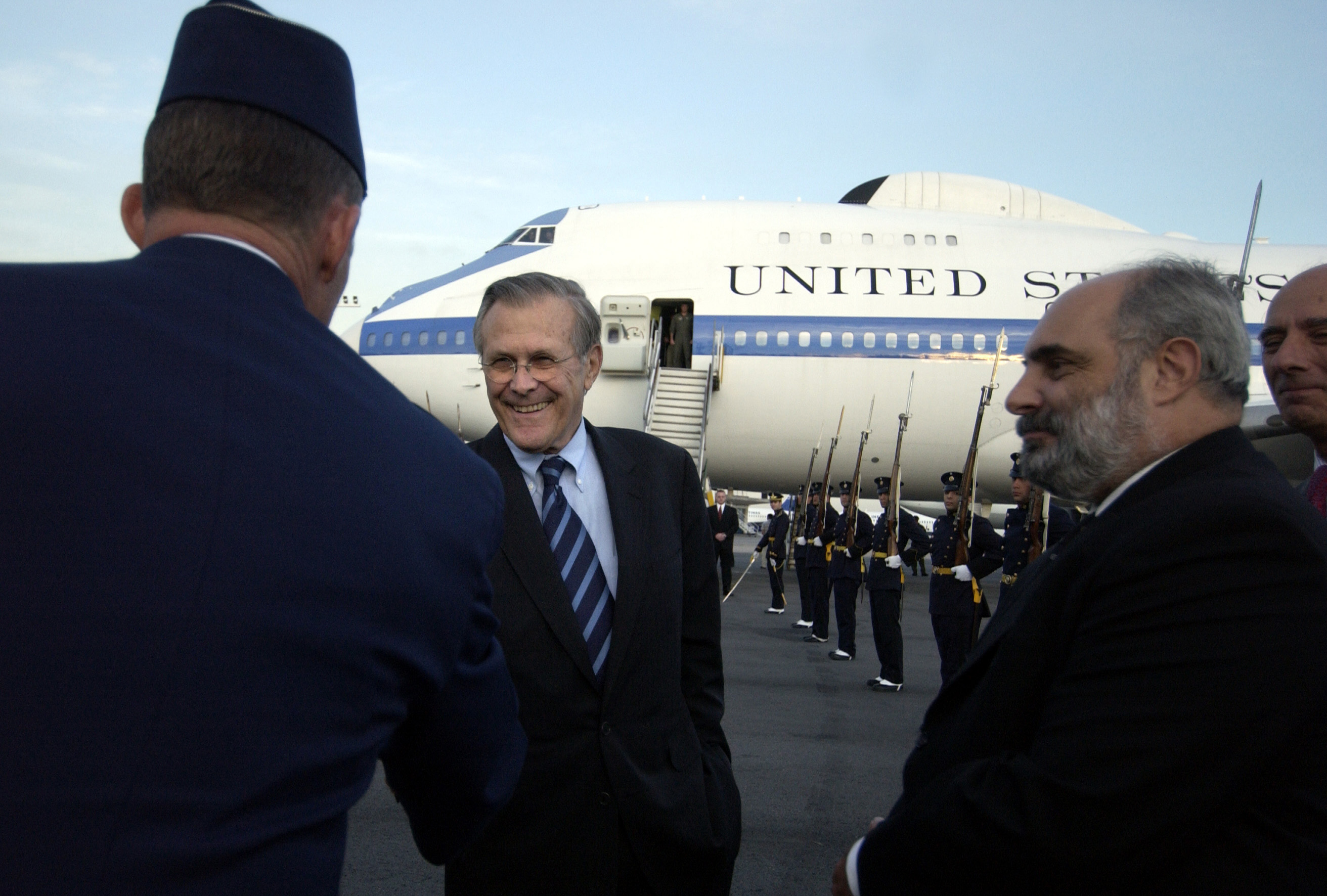
Secretary Rumsfeld during a visit to Buenos Aires, Argentina

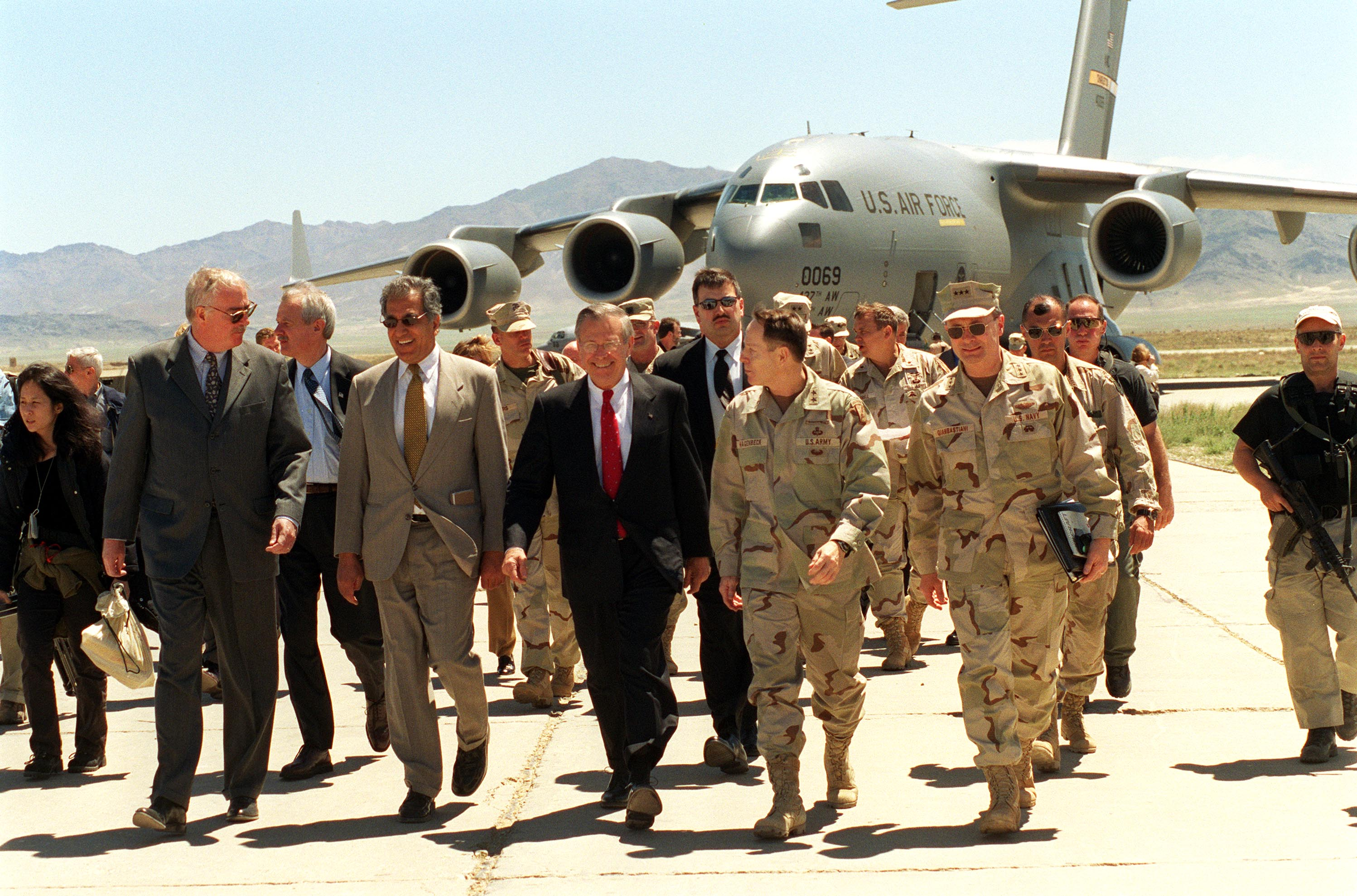
U.S. Secretary of Defense Donald Rumsfeld during a visit to Bagram Air Force Base

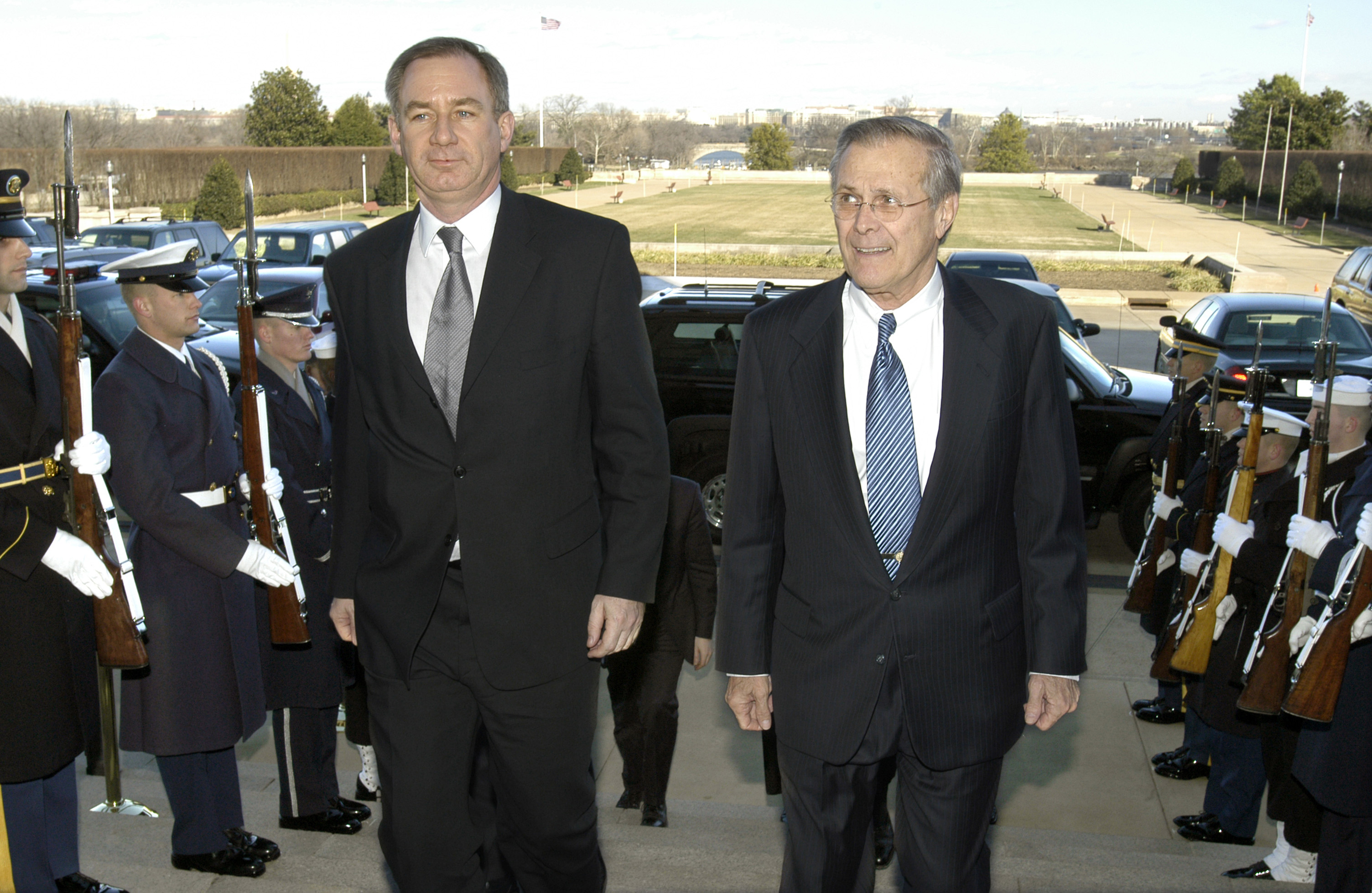
Rumsfeld with UK Secretary of State for Defence Geoffrey Hoon

== Works ==
- Rumsfeld, Donald (1998). "Strategic Imperatives in East Asia". Heritage lectures, no. 605. Washington, D.C.: The Heritage Foundation. Archived from the original on December 8, 2019. Speech given March 3, 1998, in Washington, D.C.
- Rumsfeld, Donald (2011). Known and Unknown: A Memoir. Sentinel. ISBN 978-1-59523-067-6.
- Rumsfeld, Donald (2013). Rumsfeld's Rules. Broadside Books. ISBN 978-0062272867.
- Rumsfeld, Donald (2018). When the Center Held: Gerald Ford and the Rescue of the American Presidency. Free Press. ISBN 978-1501172939.

== See also ==
- Agathidium rumsfeldi – Species of beetle named after Rumsfeld
- Early association with liberal activist Allard Lowenstein
- Known and Unknown: A Memoir – 2011 autobiographical book by Donald Rumsfeld
- Rumsfeld Doctrine – American military doctrine
- There are known knowns – 2002 phrase from Donald Rumsfeld

== General and cited sources ==
- Bradley Graham (2009). By His Own Rules: The Ambitions, Successes, and Ultimate Failures of Donald Rumsfeld. PublicAffairs. ISBN 978-1-58648-421-7.
- Rowan Scarborough (2004). Rumsfeld's War: The Untold Story of America's Anti-Terrorist Commander. Regnery Publishing. ISBN 978-0-89526-069-7.
- Midge Decter. Rumsfeld: A Personal Portrait. (Regan Books, 2003). ISBN 0-06-056091-6.
- Jeffrey A. Krames (2002). The Rumsfeld Way: The Leadership Wisdom of a Battle-Hardened Maverick. McGraw-Hill. ISBN 978-0-07-140641-3.
- Hoehn, Andrew R.; Albert A. Robbert; Margaret C. Harrell (2011). Succession management for senior military positions: the Rumsfeld model for Secretary of Defense involvement. Santa Monica, CA: RAND. ISBN 978-0-8330-5228-5.
- Andrew Cockburn (2007). Rumsfeld: His Rise, Fall, and Catastrophic Legacy. Scribners. ISBN 978-1-4165-3574-4.
- Dale R. Herspring (2008). Rumsfeld's Wars: The Arrogance of Power. University Press of Kansas. ISBN 978-0-7006-1587-2.
- George W. Bush (2010). Decision Points. Crown. ISBN 978-0-307-59061-9.

U.S. House of Representatives
Preceded by Marguerite Church	Member of the U.S. House of Representatives from Illinois's 13th congressional district 1963–1969	Succeeded by Phil Crane
Political offices
Preceded by Bertrand Harding	Director of the Office of Economic Opportunity; 1969–1970	Succeeded by Frank Carlucci
Preceded by Bryce Harlow	Counselor to the President; 1970–1971; Served alongside: Robert Finch	Succeeded by Robert Finch
Preceded by Pat Moynihan	Counselor to the President; 1970–1971; Served alongside: Robert Finch	Succeeded by Robert Finch
Preceded by Alexander Haig	White House Chief of Staff; 1974–1975	Succeeded by Dick Cheney
Preceded by James Schlesinger	United States Secretary of Defense; 1975–1977	Succeeded by Harold Brown
Preceded by Bill Cohen	United States Secretary of Defense; 2001–2006	Succeeded by Bob Gates
Diplomatic posts
Preceded by David Kennedy	United States Ambassador to NATO; 1973–1974	Succeeded by David Bruce
Preceded by Robert McFarlane	United States Special Envoy to the Middle East; 1983–1984	Office abolished
