= Socratic =

Socratic means "related to Socrates".

Socratic may also refer to:

== Common uses ==
- Socratic dialogue, a genre of literary prose
- Socratic intellectualism, a view in meta-ethics according to which genuine moral knowledge must take the form of arriving at discursive moral judgements about what one should do
- Socratic irony, a rhetorical device and literary technique
- Socratic method, a form of argumentative dialogue between individuals, based on asking and answering questions
- Socratic paradox (disambiguation)
- Socratic problem, a problem in reconstructing a historical and philosophical image of Socrates
- Socratic questioning, an educational method that focuses on discovering answers by asking questions of students

== Other uses ==
- Socratic (band), an American rock band
- Socratic (Google), an American educacional technology company
