= Electoral history of Donald Rumsfeld =

List of elections featuring Donald Rumsfeld as a candidate

This is a list of the electoral history of Donald Rumsfeld.

== U.S. House of Representatives elections ==
Illinois's 13th congressional district, 1962 (Republican primary):

- Donald Rumsfeld - 47,037 (67.71%)
- Marion E. Burks - 19,037 (27.40%)
- Raymond Albert Morley - 2,187 (3.15%)
- Edward L. Gordy

Illinois's 13th congressional district, 1962:

- Donald Rumsfeld (R) - 139,230 (63.52%)
- John A. Kennedy (D) - 79,419 (36.23%)
- Write-ins - 542 (0.25%)

Illinois's 13th congressional district, 1964:

- Donald Rumsfeld (R) (inc.) - 165,129 (57.82%)
- Lynn A. Williams (D) - 120,449 (42.18%)

Illinois's 13th congressional district, 1966:

- Donald Rumsfeld (R) (inc.) - 158,769 (76.01%)
- James L. McCabe (D) - 50,107 (23.99%)

Illinois's 13th congressional district, 1968:

- Donald Rumsfeld (R) (inc.) - 186,714 (72.74%)
- David C. Baylor (D) - 69,987 (27.26%)

== Republican National Conventions ==
1976 Republican National Convention (vice presidential tally):

- Bob Dole - 1,921 (85.04%)
- Abstaining - 103 (4.56%)
- Jesse Helms - 103 (4.56%)
- Ronald Reagan - 27 (1.20%)
- Phil Crane - 23 (1.02%)
- John Grady - 19 (0.84%)
- Louis Frey - 9 (0.40%)
- Anne Armstrong - 6 (0.27%)
- Howard Baker - 6 (0.27%)
- William F. Buckley - 4 (0.18%)
- John B. Connally - 4 (0.18%)
- David C. Treen - 4 (0.18%)
- Alan Steelman - 3 (0.13%)
- Edmund Bauman - 2 (0.09%)
- Bill Brock - 2 (0.09%)
- Paul Laxalt - 2 (0.09%)
- Elliot Richardson - 2 (0.09%)
- Richard Schweiker - 2 (0.09%)
- William E. Simon - 2 (0.09%)
- Jack Wellborn - 2 (0.09%)
- James Allen - 1 (0.04%)
- Ray Barnhardt - 1 (0.04%)
- George H. W. Bush - 1 (0.04%)
- Pete Domenici - 1 (0.04%)
- James B. Edwards - 1 (0.04%)
- Frank S. Glenn - 1 (0.04%)
- David Keane - 1 (0.04%)
- James McClure - 1 (0.04%)
- Nancy Palm - 1 (0.04%)
- Donald Rumsfeld - 1 (0.04%)
- John W. Sears - 1 (0.04%)
- Roger Staubach - 1 (0.04%)
- Steve Symms - 1 (0.04%)

1980 Republican National Convention (vice presidential tally):

- George H. W. Bush - 1,832 (93.33%)
- Jesse Helms - 54 (2.75%)
- Jack Kemp - 42 (2.14%)
- Phil Crane - 23 (1.17%)
- James R. Thompson - 5 (0.26%)
- John M. Ashbrook - 1 (0.05%)
- Howard Baker - 1 (0.05%)
- Henry J. Hyde - 1 (0.05%)
- Donald Rumsfeld - 1 (0.05%)
- Eugene Schroeder - 1 (0.05%)
- William E. Simon - 1 (0.05%)
- Guy Vander Jagt - 1 (0.05%)

== See also ==
- Gerald Ford
- George H. W. Bush
- George W. Bush
- Known and Unknown: A Memoir
- Robert McNamara
- 'There are known knowns'
- United States Secretary of Defense
