= Ignorance management =

Knowledge management practice

Ignorance management is a knowledge management practice that addresses the concept of ignorance in organizations.

== Overview ==
Logically, ignorance management is based upon the concept of ignorance. John Israilidis, Russell Lock, and Louise Cooke of Loughborough University described ignorance management as:

"[...] a process of discovering, exploring, realising, recognising and managing ignorance outside and inside the organisation through an appropriate management process to meet current and future demands, design better policy and modify actions in order to achieve organisational objectives and sustain competitive advantage."

The key principle of this theory is that knowledge management (KM) could better be seen as ignorance management, due to the fact that it is impossible for someone to comprehend and understand everything in a complete way. The only real wisdom is in recognising the limits and extent of one's knowledge, and therefore KM is essentially a matter of sharing the extent of one's ignorance with other people, and thus learning together. This process of knowing what is needed to know, and also acknowledging the power of understanding the unknown, could develop a tacit understanding and could improve both short-term opportunistic value capture and longer term business sustainability.

== Research ==
Several attempts have been made to explore the value of managing organisational ignorance in order to prevent failures within knowledge transfer contexts. The need to recognise the role and significance of power in the management of ignorance has been introduced to further enhance such efforts. Also, a growing body of psychology research shows that humans find it intrinsically difficult to get a sense of what they do not know, and argues that incompetence deprives people of the ability to recognise their own incompetence (the Dunning–Kruger effect). The viewpoint of developing our understanding of organisational ignorance can yield impressive benefits, if successfully incorporated within a company's KM strategy.

== See also ==
- Agnatology
- I know that I know nothing
- Ignoramus et ignorabimus
- There are known knowns
- Unknown known
