= Foot in Mouth Award =

Award by the Plain English Campaign

- Awarded for: "a baffling comment by a public figure"
- Country: United Kingdom
- Presented by: Plain English Campaign
- First award: 1993
- Final award: 2022
- Website: plainenglish.co.uk

The Foot in Mouth Award is presented each year by the Plain English Campaign for "a baffling comment by a public figure". The award was first made in 1993, when it was given to Ted Dexter, the chairman of selectors for the England cricket team. It was awarded again the following year, and, after a two-year break, annually from 1997 to 2022, after which it was not awarded from 2022 onward.

The Plain English Campaign was set up in 1979 when the founder, Chrissie Maher, shredded hundreds of jargon-filled forms and documents in Parliament Square, London. The group gave their first awards the next year, rewarding organisations that used "plain English" and highlighting those that did not. Although the Foot in Mouth award was first presented in 1993, the group's 1991 awards gave acknowledgement to a confusing comment by Dan Quayle, then Vice President of the United States.

The award has been presented 29 times, with only Boris Johnson and Rhodri Morgan receiving it more than once. Johnson won in 2004, 2016, and 2019, while Morgan won in 1998 and 2005. Johnson made a light-hearted response to his second win, claiming that the first award had "made [his] name." Politicians have been recipients of the award more times than any profession, collecting it on sixteen occasions; athletes, sports managers and sports commentators have won five times. George W. Bush received a "Lifetime Achievement Award" in 2008 for "services to gobbledygook" throughout his presidency.

The phrase "foot in mouth" is of a family of idioms having to do with eating and being proven incorrect, such as to "eat crow", "eat dirt", to "eat your hat" (or shoe); all probably originating from "to eat one's words", which first appears in print in 1571 in one of John Calvin's tracts, on Psalm 62: "God eateth not his words when he hath once spoken".

== Winners ==
Foot in Mouth award winners
Year	Recipient	Image	Rationale	Ref
1991	Dan Quayle	Dan Quayle	Although the Foot in Mouth award was not introduced until 1993, Vice President of the United States Dan Quayle received a special mention during the Plain English Campaign's 1991 awards for saying: "We offer the party as a big tent. How we do that with the platform, the preamble to the platform or whatnot, that remains to be seen. But that message will have to be articulated with great clarity."	
1993	Ted Dexter	Ted Dexter	Dexter, a senior figure in the Marylebone Cricket Club, won the inaugural award for trying to explain a loss by the England cricket team by saying: "Maybe we are in the wrong sign. Maybe Venus is in the wrong juxtaposition with something else. I don't know."	
1994	Gordon Brown	Gordon Brown	As the Shadow Chancellor of the Exchequer, Brown gave a speech on "New Economics" full of jargon such as "the growth of post neo-classical endogenous growth theory" and "debate over the meaning and implications of competitiveness at the level of individuals, the firm or the nation and the role of government in fashioning modern industrial policies which focus on nurturing competitiveness."	
Not awarded in 1995 and 1996
1997	Nick Underwood	–	A member of the Teletubbies marketing department, Underwood won the award for his explanation that "in life, there are all colours and the Teletubbies are a reflection of that. There are no nationalities in the Teletubbies – they are techno-babies, but they are supposed to reflect life in that sense."	
1998	Rhodri Morgan	Rhodri Morgan	Labour Member of Parliament Rhodri Morgan confused interviewer Jeremy Paxman when asked if he would like to be leader of the Welsh Assembly by responding: "Does a one-legged duck swim in circles?"	
1999	Glenn Hoddle	Glenn Hoddle	The England football manager won the award for his response to a question about his earlier comments that disabled people were being punished for sins in former lives: "I do not believe that. At this moment in time, if that changes in years to come I don't know, but what happens here today and changes as we go along that is part of life's learning and part of your inner beliefs. But at this moment in time I did not say them things and at the end of the day I want to put that on record because it has hurt people."	
2000	Alicia Silverstone	Alicia Silverstone	The American actress was awarded for saying: "I think that Clueless was very deep. I think it was deep in the way that it was very light. I think lightness has to come from a very deep place if it's true lightness."	
2001	Tracey Emin	Tracey Emin	Artist Tracey Emin won the award for her comment: "When it comes to words I have a uniqueness that I find almost impossible in terms of art – and it's my words that actually make my art quite unique."	
2002	Richard Gere	Richard Gere	The American actor was presented with the award for his comment: "I know who I am. No one else knows who I am. If I was a giraffe and somebody said I was a snake, I'd think 'No, actually I am a giraffe.'"	
2003	Donald Rumsfeld	Donald Rumsfeld	For a press briefing on Iraq and weapons of mass destruction given as United States Secretary of Defense: "Reports that say that something hasn't happened are always interesting to me, because as we know, there are known knowns; there are things we know we know. We also know there are known unknowns; that is to say we know there are some things we do not know. But there are also unknown unknowns – the ones we don't know we don't know."	
2004	Boris Johnson	Boris Johnson	In an episode of the panel show Have I Got News for You, Conservative Member of Parliament Johnson commented, "I could not fail to disagree with you less."	
2005	Rhodri Morgan	Rhodri Morgan	The second award given to Morgan, then First Minister of Wales, was presented for a remark he made during a debate on policing: "The only thing which isn't up for grabs is no change and I think it's fair to say, it's all to play for, except for no change."	
2006	Naomi Campbell	Naomi Campbell	The English supermodel picked up the award for saying, "I love England, especially the food. There's nothing I like more than a lovely bowl of pasta."	
2007	Steve McClaren	Steve McClaren	The England football manager won for his description of footballer Wayne Rooney in a BBC Radio 5 Live interview: "He is inexperienced, but he's experienced in terms of what he's been through."	
2008	George W. Bush	George W. Bush	Bush was given a "Lifetime Achievement Award" for "services to gobbledygook" during his final year as President of the United States. His gaffes were described as covering a large number of topics, and included comments such as "I know what I believe. I will continue to articulate what I believe and what I believe – I believe what I believe is right" and "I hope you leave here and walk out and say, 'what did he say?'"	
2009	Peter Mandelson	Peter Mandelson	Awarded for the Labour politician's remark on the investigation into the United Kingdom parliamentary expenses scandal: "Perhaps we need not more people looking round more corners but the same people looking round more corners more thoroughly to avoid the small things detracting from the big things the Prime Minister [previous winner Gordon Brown] is getting right."	
2010	Jamie Redknapp	Jamie Redknapp	For repeated misuse of the word "literally" during his career as a sports commentator, such as "These balls now – they literally explode off your feet."	
2011	Silvio Berlusconi	Silvio Berlusconi	The former Prime Minister of Italy received the award for comments such as "I am pretty often faithful" and his description of Barack Obama as being "handsome, young and also suntanned".	
2012	Mitt Romney	Mitt Romney	U.S. Presidential candidate Mitt Romney received the award for making gaffes on the domestic front ("I like being able to fire people who provide services to me"); on the international stage (for example, regarding the London Olympics: "There are a few things that were disconcerting. The stories about the private security firm not having enough people, the supposed strike of the immigration and customs officials – that obviously is not something which is encouraging"); and confused comments such as "I believe in an America where millions of Americans believe in an America that's the America millions of Americans believe in. That's the America I love."	
2013	Godfrey Bloom	Godfrey Bloom	UK Independence Party MEP Godfrey Bloom received the award after making a series of controversial statements in 2013, including describing countries that receive foreign aid from the UK as "Bongo Bongo Land", saying that women don't "clean behind the fridge enough", jokingly referring to female members of an audience as "sluts" and assaulting one journalist and threatening another. A spokesman called him "an overwhelming choice" who "could easily have won this award on at least two other occasions...[he is] a wince-inducing gaffe machine and we could fill a page or two with his ill-advised quotes from 2013 alone."	
2014	Russell Brand	Russell Brand	The Plain English Campaign said that Brand was "out on his own" among contenders for the title, adding: "While we admire Russell's determination to open up a debate about democracy and the dire state of the world, we struggle to make sense of most of his comments." Among Brand's quotes singled out by the campaign was: "The internal mayhem I'm feeling is spilling out everywhere. I loved it, and felt very connected to activism – particularly activism that feels loaded with potential. Not the oppositional activism that seems like there's a stasis around it – earnestly sincere, but a monolith equal to the establishment."	
2015	Donald Trump	Donald Trump	Businessman Donald Trump was at the time campaigning for the Republican nomination in the 2016 US presidential election. The Plain English Campaign said that Trump was "unrivalled" for the award. In particular the campaign cited his remarks on Mexican immigrants ("They're bringing drugs. They're bringing crime. They're rapists. And some, I assume, are good people.") and on Senator John McCain: "He's not a war hero. He was a war hero because he was captured. I like people who weren't captured."	
2016	Boris Johnson	Boris Johnson	A regular contender for the award, then-Foreign Secretary Johnson's second win was secured by the phrase "Brexit means Brexit and we're going to make a titanic success of it," widely perceived as an unwitting reference to the sinking of the Titanic.	
2017	Jacob Rees-Mogg	Jacobreesmogg	Conservative MP Jacob Rees-Mogg won the year's award, ahead of previous winners Donald Trump and Boris Johnson, for describing food banks as "rather uplifting".	
2018	Elon Musk	Elon Musk 2015	Musk received the award for the comment "Sorry pedo guy, you really did ask for it," in response to British-Thai caver Vern Unsworth rejecting his proposal to build a submersible to aid in the Tham Luang cave rescue.	
2019	Boris Johnson	Boris Johnson	On 5 September, Prime Minister Johnson stated that he would "rather be dead in a ditch" than request an extension to the Brexit deadline of 31 October; Johnson later wrote to European Council president Donald Tusk to request an extension after being compelled to do so by the Benn Act.	
2020	Toby Young	Toby Young in 2011	British journalist Toby Young won for claims made about the COVID-19 pandemic in a Telegraph article: "I'm going to go out on a limb and predict there will be no 'second spike' – not now, and not in the autumn either. The virus has melted into thin air. It's time to get back to normal."	
2021	Dominic Raab	Dominic Raab	Deputy Prime Minister Dominic Raab, a frequent runner-up, was awarded for misinterpreting the term misogyny: "Misogyny is absolutely wrong – whether it’s a man against a woman, or a woman against a man."	
2022	Gianni Infantino	Gianni Infantino	FIFA president Gianni Infantino was awarded for his justification for the 2022 FIFA World Cup being held in Qatar despite concerns over the country's human rights record: "Today I have very strong feelings. Today, I feel Qatari. Today, I feel Arab. Today, I feel African. Today, I feel gay. Today, I feel disabled. Today, I feel a migrant worker. I feel all this because what I have been seeing and what I have been told, since I don't read, otherwise I will be depressed."	
