= Ignoramus =

Ignoramus may refer to:

- Latin for "we do not know"
- Ignoramus, a college farce written in 1615 in Latin by George Ruggle
- An ignorant person or dunce (as a consequence of Ruggle's play)
- A verdict by a Grand Jury, meaning "we do not know of any reason why this person should be indicted on these charges"

== See also ==
- Ignoramus et ignorabimus
