= Failure of imagination =

Emergency management term

Failure of imagination is a phrase to explain an unexpected event that was seemingly predictable in hindsight. The idea was invoked by the 9/11 Commission and other U.S. government officials as a reason that intelligence agencies, such as the Central Intelligence Agency and the NSA, failed to prevent the September 11 attacks. It has since been used to characterize the existential risk from artificial intelligence.

== September 11 attacks ==
"Failure of imagination" has been invoked as a reason that intelligence agencies, such as the Central Intelligence Agency and the NSA, failed to prevent the September 11 attacks. Following these criticisms, President Bush declassified the August 6, 2001 President's Daily Brief, Bin Ladin Determined To Strike in US, which indicated that hijackings might be one possible mode of attack.

After the attacks, representatives of the Bush administration claimed in early 2004 that "nobody could have imagined that ... hijackers would intentionally crash ... hijackers usually want to live." To the contrary, the apparently intentional crash of EgyptAir Flight 990 by its co-pilot on October 31, 1999, and a similar intentional crash of PSA Flight 1771 by a disgruntled former airline employee on December 7, 1987, and especially the case of AFR 8969, offered precedents that indicated otherwise. Similarly, it was stated that nobody imagined that hijackers would use commercial aircraft as weapons; however, in 1997, The Gore Commission, created by President Clinton in 1996 as a result of the TWA Flight 800 crash, published a report on the shortcomings in aviation security in the United States. The report focused mainly on the dangers of placing bombs on aircraft and did not mention suicide hijacking or the use of aircraft as weapons.

Prior to the 9/11 attacks, a number of foreign nationals were taking pilot training in the U.S. and raised suspicion by being uninterested in learning how to land safely. The 9/11 Commission found that this failure to "connect the dots" and imagine what was being planned was an important contributing factor to the September 11 attacks, stating "the most important failure [concerning the 9/11 attacks] was one of imagination."

== Other incidents ==
"Failure of imagination" has also been invoked in regards to the Apollo 1 fire by astronaut Frank Borman in 1967 when he spoke at the Apollo 1 investigation hearings (dramatized in the HBO mini-series From the Earth to the Moon in 1998).

It has also been mentioned in reference to design flaws in the RMS Titanic.

Donald Rumsfeld, in the documentary The Unknown Known, suggests that the failure of the United States to anticipate the attack on Pearl Harbor was a failure of imagination.

The phrase has also been used to describe Israel's lack of preparedness for the 2023 surprise attack by Hamas.

In July 2026 testimony before the House Permanent Select Committee on Intelligence, Benjamin Buchanan, professor at the Johns Hopkins School of Advanced International Studies, said existential risk from artificial intelligence presents a similar failure of imagination challenge 25 years later.

== See also ==
- Argument from ignorance
- Black swan event
- Decision theory
- Epistemology
- Hindsight bias
- Russell's teapot
- Unknown unknown
