= External image =

Image other people have of a person

In psychology, the external image (also alien image, foreign image, public image, third-party image; German: Fremdbild) is the image other people have of a person, i.e., a person's external image is the way they are viewed by other people. It contrasts with a person's self image (German: Selbstbild); how the external image is communicated to a person may affect their self esteem positively or negatively.

== Definition ==
An external image is the totality of all perceptions, feelings, and judgments that third parties make about an individual. These interpersonal perceptions are automatically linked to earlier experiences with the person being observed and with the feelings arising from these interactions and evaluations. The image that others have of a person shapes their expectations of this person, and significantly affects their mutual social interaction.

== External image and self image ==
A person's external image, or more precisely, how this image is communicated to the individual, and how others react to the individual as a result of his or her external image, significantly affects the person's self image. Positive, appreciative external images strengthen an individual's self confidence and self esteem. In extreme cases, negative or conflicting external images can cause mental illness.

The external image is always different from an individual's self-image. From the two perspectives and the differences between them, or more accurately, the inferences that the two parties draw for themselves, social interactions evolve, influenced by the parties' own selves.

== In group dynamics ==
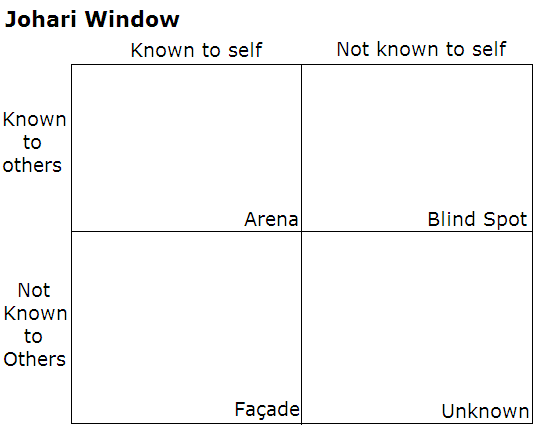
Johari window

Conscious handling of images about each other plays an important part in group dynamics. In feedback exercises, subjects are trained in giving and receiving external images. The Johari window describes the relationship between external and self images, and that between conscious and unconscious parts of these images. With mindful "awareness exercises", a person is trained to detect previously unconscious expectations of third parties, and with communication exercises, they are trained to reconcile their own and others' images and expectations of each other.

== In psychotherapy ==
Psychotherapy also deals with external images when treating depression or in dealing with the effects of trauma or bullying, or more generally in counseling members of marginalized groups.

== See also ==
- Constructivism
- Othering
