= The Unknown Known =

2013 film

- Theatrical release poster
- Directed by: Errol Morris
- Written by: Errol Morris
- Produced by: Robert Fernandez; Amanda Branson Gill; Errol Morris
- Starring: Donald Rumsfeld; Errol Morris
- Cinematography: Robert Chappell
- Edited by: Steven Hathaway
- Music by: Danny Elfman
- Production companies: History Films; Moxie Pictures; Participant Media
- Distributed by: Radius-TWC
- Release dates: August 29, 2013 (Telluride Film Festival); April 4, 2014 (United States)
- Running time: 105 minutes
- Country: United States
- Language: English
- Box office: $301,604

The Unknown Known (also known as The Unknown Known: The Life and Times of Donald Rumsfeld) is a 2013 American documentary film about the political career of former U.S. Secretary of Defense and congressman Donald Rumsfeld, directed by Academy Award winning documentarian and filmmaker Errol Morris. It is a summary of 33 hours of interviews that Morris conducted with Rumsfeld over eleven separate sessions during visits to Newton, Massachusetts. The film was released on April 4, 2014 by Radius-TWC and is dedicated to the memory of Roger Ebert.

== Synopsis ==
The major portion of the documentary is spent addressing excerpts from the countless memos, nicknamed "Yellow Perils" by his first Pentagon staff and "Snowflakes" by the second, that Rumsfeld wrote during his time as a congressman and advisor to four different presidents, twice as United States Secretary of Defense. It also focuses on a response Rumsfeld gave to a question at a U.S. Department of Defense news briefing on February 12, 2002, about the lack of evidence linking the government of Iraq with the supply of weapons of mass destruction to terrorist groups. The content of the memos are varied, covering everything from the aftermath of Watergate, to the torture and abuse of prisoners at Abu Ghraib, to the definition of the word "terrorism". Morris returns to the motif of snowflakes swirling within a globe throughout the documentary as he discusses the memos with Rumsfeld, the contents of which the Defense Secretary allowed him limited access to while preparing the film, and several of which Rumsfeld agrees to read aloud on camera.

At the beginning of the documentary, Rumsfeld argues that a major purpose of the Department of Defense is to evaluate "unknown knowns", or "the things you think you know, that it turns out you did not", to anticipate hostile actions before they take place. Illustrating his point, Rumsfeld suggests that the failure of the United States to anticipate the attack on Pearl Harbor was a failure of imagination.

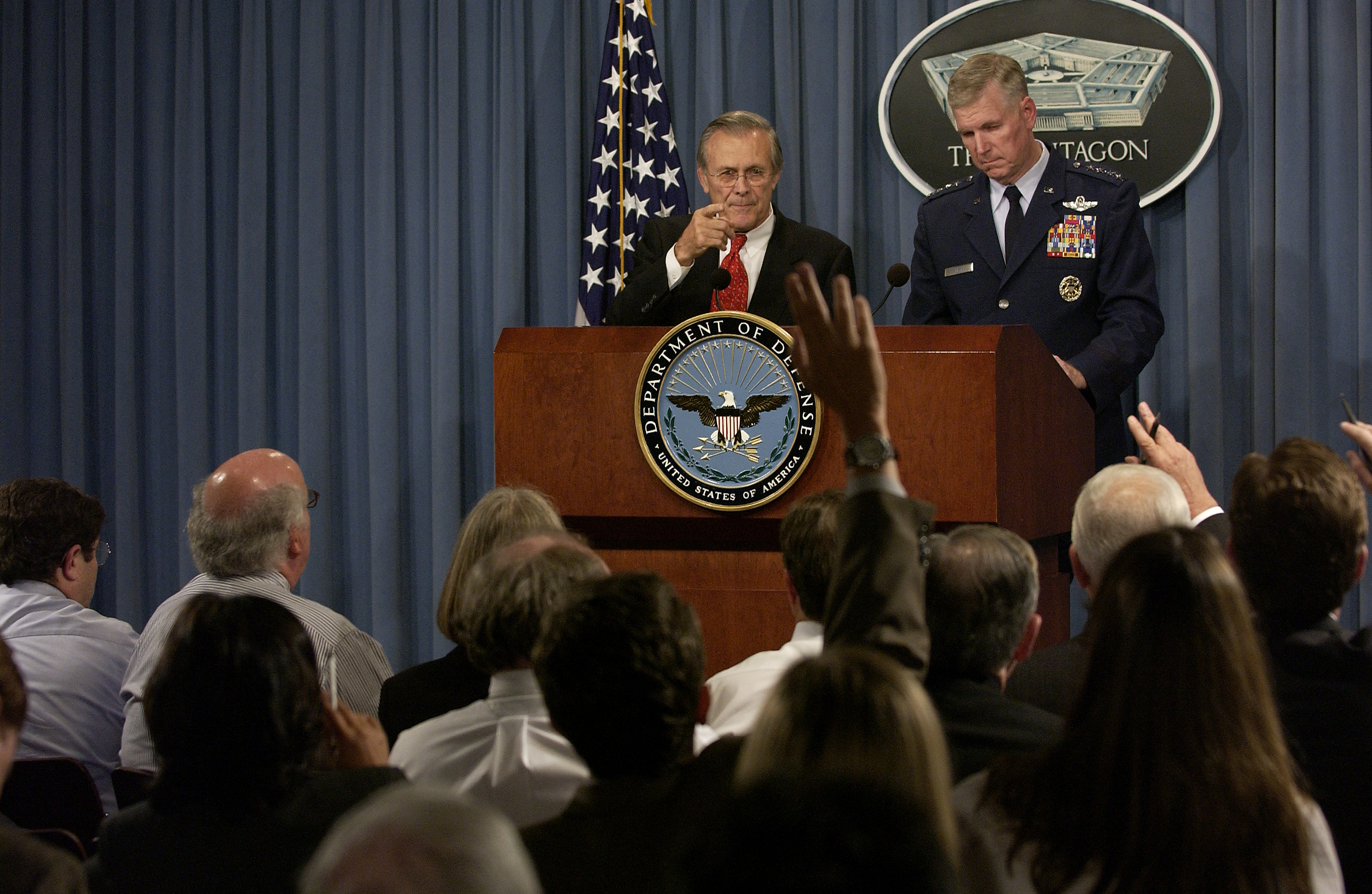
Rumsfeld during a news briefing in the Pentagon

As the interviews proceed, the director is able to catch his subject lying on camera, though when he does, Rumsfeld does not acknowledge it or deflects the conversation, with Morris finding the politician unwilling or unable to engage in meaningful self-reflection. When the director asks Rumsfeld about lessons he learned from the Vietnam War, Rumsfeld states: "Some things work out, some things don't. That didn't." Rumsfeld also expresses good-natured surprise at the list of torture techniques—including hooding, stress positions, and nudity—that he personally approved for use on Guantánamo detainees, stating: "Good grief! That’s a pile of stuff!" In follow up, Morris questions him about the so-called "Torture Memos" sent by Assistant Attorney General John Yoo to the Department of Defense describing enhanced interrogation techniques. When Rumsfeld indicates he never read them despite being the head of the department, Morris responds in disbelief: "Really?" When asked if the Iraq War was a mistake, Rumsfeld replies plaintively: "I guess time will tell."

In the penultimate scene of the documentary, Morris questions Rumsfeld again about "unknown knowns", and Rumsfeld's definition has inverted since the beginning of the interview, with him now defining them as: "things that you know, that you don't know you know". Morris is quick to point out the incongruity, and Rumsfeld acknowledges it when shown his memo, but suggests his earlier definition was wrong. As the documentary closes, Morris asks Rumsfeld why he agreed to the interviews, and Rumsfeld responds: "That is a vicious question. I'll be darned if I know."

== Cast ==
- Donald Rumsfeld as himself (interviewee)
- Errol Morris as himself (interviewer) (voice)
- Kenn Medeiros as younger Donald Rumsfeld / Secret Service

== Release ==
The Unknown Known was screened in the main competition section at the 70th Venice International Film Festival, and premiered at the Telluride Film Festival on August 29, 2013.

=== Critical reception ===
On review aggregator website Rotten Tomatoes, the film has an approval rating of 81% based on 106 reviews, with an average score of 6.8/10; the site's "critics consensus" reads: "Viewers hoping to see Donald Rumsfeld admit making mistakes in public office may find The Unknown Known frustrating – but no less fascinating." On Metacritic, the film has a weighted average score of 69 out of 100 based on 30 critics, indicating "generally favorable reviews".

David Denby of The New Yorker wrote: "If Morris doesn’t quite nail Rumsfeld, his questions lead the Secretary to nail himself. You watch him obfuscate, fudge the issue of torture, smirk about George H. W. Bush (whom he doesn’t like), and offer dull commonplaces when impassioned clarity is called for." Mary Corliss of Time wrote: "Morris's movie is a cat-and-mouse game, and Rumsfeld is the cat, virtually licking his chops as he toys with, and then devours, another rival." Colin Colvert of the Minneapolis Star Tribune wrote: "Morris is admirably evenhanded, never demonizing his subject, but giving him enough rope to hang himself. Rumsfeld, cool and bemused, refuses to knot the noose."

=== Comparisons to The Fog of War ===
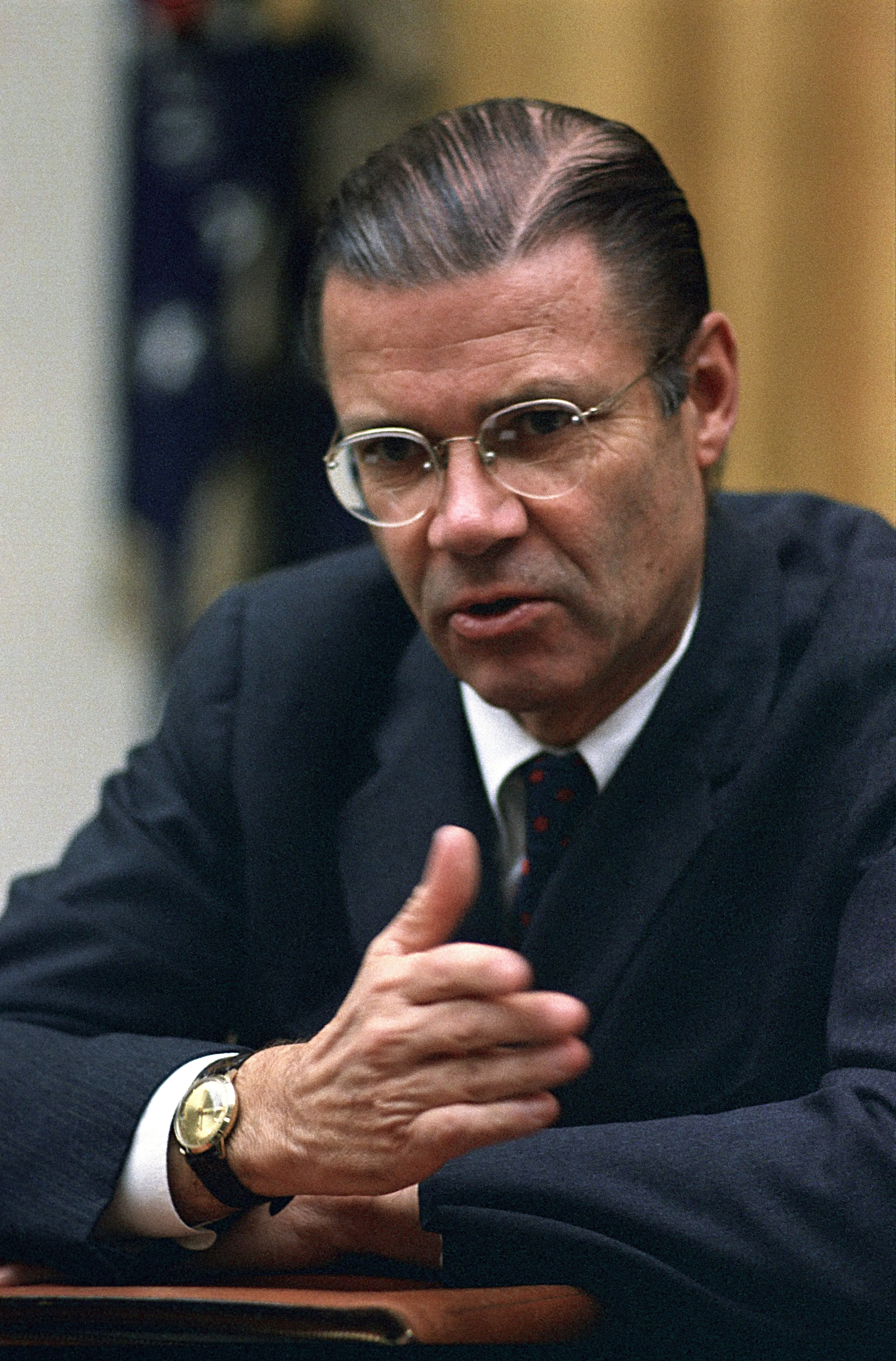
Reviews have compared the film to Morris's Academy Award-winning predecessor, The Fog of War (2003), a similar interview of Robert McNamara, the longest serving U.S. Secretary of Defense.

Several reviews of The Unknown Known compared it to Morris's Academy Award-winning predecessor The Fog of War (2003), with the follow-up being described as a "spiritual sequel". The earlier documentary is about Robert McNamara, the longest serving U.S. Secretary of Defense, with Rumsfeld being the second. Both films consist largely of interviews with former Defense Secretary octogenarians who were dismissed prematurely from their posts, and who discuss their roles as the voice of some of the most unpopular wars in American history—for McNamara, Vietnam and for Rumsfeld, Iraq.

At one point during the interview, Morris asked Rumsfeld if he had seen The Fog of War, to which Rumsfeld responded: "I hate it....that man had nothing to apologize for".

Morris has been resistant to comparisons between the two films, stating: "You can’t call this 'The Fog of War 2'. I can’t imagine two individuals more unalike."

== See also ==
- Abu Ghraib torture and prisoner abuse
- Electoral history of Donald Rumsfeld
- Enhanced interrogation techniques
- Epistemic modal logic
- Foreign policy of the George W. Bush administration
- Gerald Ford
- George H. W. Bush
- George W. Bush
- Guantanamo Bay detention camp
- Hamdan v. Rumsfeld
- Iraq War
- Known and Unknown: A Memoir
- National Security Strategy (United States)
- Overseas interventions of the United States
- 'There are known knowns'
- Torture Memos
- United States Secretary of Defense
- Vietnam War
