= There are unknown unknowns =

2002 phrase from Donald Rumsfeld

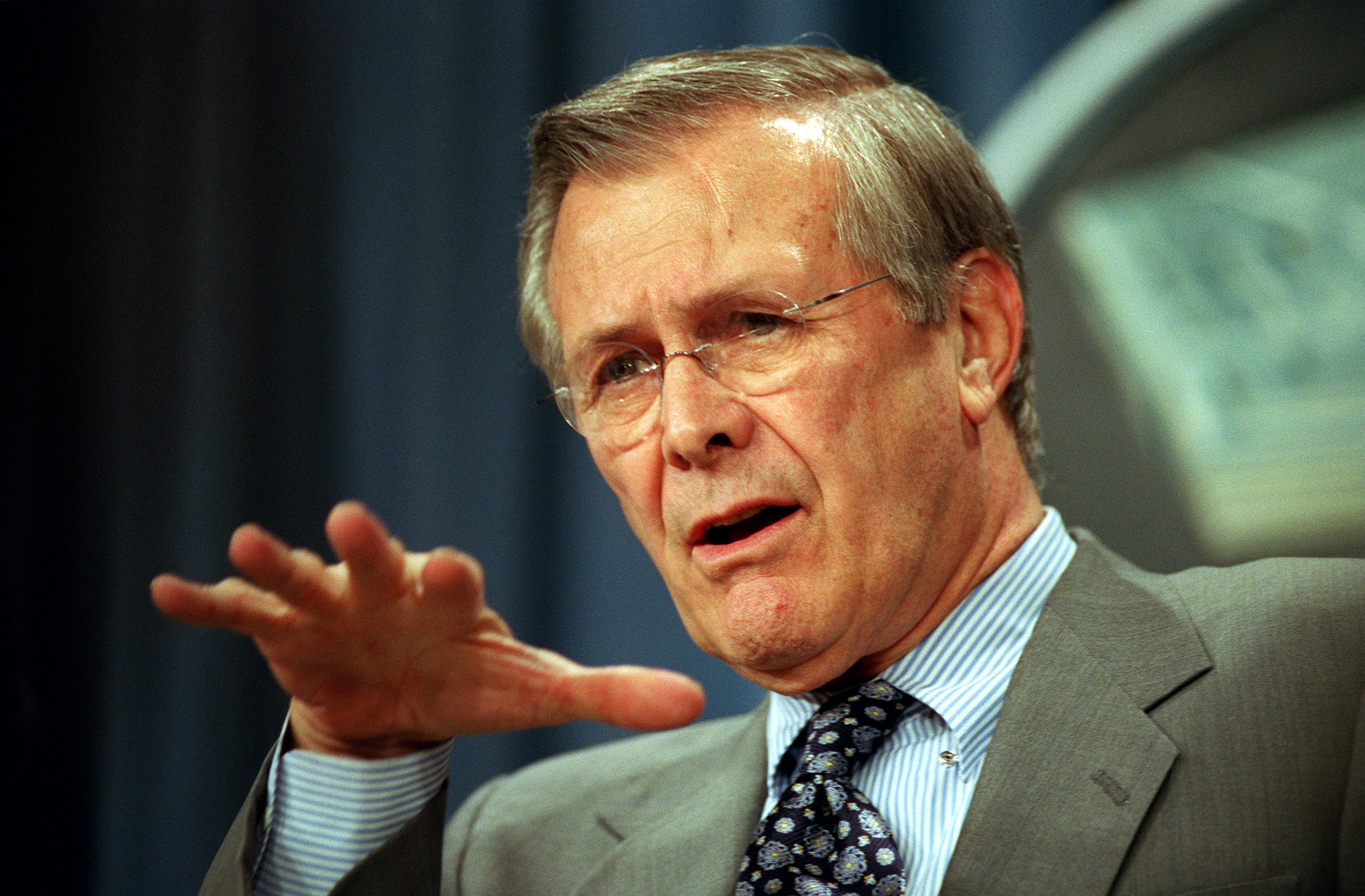
Rumsfeld during a Pentagon news briefing in February 2002

"There are unknown unknowns" is a phrase from a response United States Secretary of Defense Donald Rumsfeld gave to a question at a U.S. Department of Defense (DoD) news briefing on February 12, 2002, about the lack of evidence linking the government of Iraq with the supply of weapons of mass destruction to terrorist groups. Rumsfeld stated:

Reports that say that something hasn't happened are always interesting to me, because as we know, there are known knowns; there are things we know we know. We also know there are known unknowns; that is to say we know there are some things we do not know. But there are also unknown unknowns—the ones we don't know we don't know. And if one looks throughout the history of our country and other free countries, it is the latter category that tends to be the difficult ones.

The statement became the subject of much commentary. In The Decision Book (2013), author Mikael Krogerus refers to it as the "Rumsfeld matrix". The statement also features in a 2013 documentary film, The Unknown Known, directed by Errol Morris.

Known unknowns refers to "risks you are aware of, such as canceled flights", whereas unknown unknowns are risks that come from situations that are so unexpected that they would not be considered.

== Origins ==
Rumsfeld's statement brought attention to the concepts of known knowns, known unknowns, and unknown unknowns, but these were in common use in US defense procurement by the late 1960s. In a 1968 study sponsored by the Aerospace Industries Association, Hudson Drake from North American Rockwell argued that defence contractors had to solve both known unknowns and "unanticipated unknowns". Also in 1968, Lt. Gen. William B. Bunker noted that when developing complex weapons systems "there are two kinds of technical problems: there are the known unknowns, and the unknown unknowns." The usage was common enough for an industry shorthand to have developed where unknown-unknowns were referred to as "unk-unks".

The term was commonly used inside NASA. Rumsfeld cited NASA administrator William Graham in his memoir; he wrote that he had first heard "a variant of the phrase" from Graham when they served together on the Commission to Assess the Ballistic Missile Threat to the United States during the late 1990s. Rumsfeld had previously publicly used the terms himself, stating in a 2000 speech that "There are known knowns, known unknowns and unknown unknowns. Effective intelligence work must consider them all."

The terms "known unknowns" and "unknown unknowns" are often used in project management and strategic planning circles.

Contemporary usage is largely consistent with the earliest known usages. For example, the term was used in evidence given to the British Columbia Royal Commission of Inquiry into Uranium Mining in 1979:

Site conditions always pose unknowns, or uncertainties, which may become known during construction or operation to the detriment of the facility and possibly lead to damage of the environment or endanger public health and safety. The risk posed by unknowns is somewhat dependent on the nature of the unknown relative to past experience. This has led me to classify unknowns into one of the following two types:

1. known unknowns (expected or foreseeable conditions), which can be reasonably anticipated but not quantified based on past experience as exemplified by case histories (in Appendix A) and

2. Unknown unknowns (unexpected or unforeseeable conditions), which pose a potentially greater risk simply because they cannot be anticipated based on past experience or investigation.

Known unknowns result from recognized but poorly understood phenomena. On the other hand, unknown unknowns are phenomena which cannot be expected because there has been no prior experience or theoretical basis for expecting the phenomena.

The term also appeared in a 1982 New Yorker article on the aerospace industry, which cites the example of metal fatigue, the cause of crashes in de Havilland Comet airliners in the 1950s.

== Reaction ==
Canadian columnist Mark Steyn called it "in fact a brilliant distillation of quite a complex matter". Australian economist and blogger John Quiggin wrote: "Although the language may be tortured, the basic point is both valid and important."

Psychoanalytic philosopher Slavoj Žižek says that beyond these three categories there is a fourth, the unknown known, that which one intentionally refuses to acknowledge that one knows: "If Rumsfeld thinks that the main dangers in the confrontation with Iraq were the 'unknown unknowns', that is, the threats from Saddam whose nature we cannot even suspect, then the Abu Ghraib scandal shows that the main dangers lie in the 'unknown knowns'—the disavowed beliefs, suppositions and obscene practices we pretend not to know about, even though they form the background of our public values."

German sociologists Christopher Daase and Oliver Kessler agreed that the cognitive frame for political practice may be determined by the relationship between "what we know, what we do not know, what we cannot know", but stated that Rumsfeld left out "what we do not like to know".

The event has been used in multiple books to discuss risk assessment.

Rumsfeld named his 2011 autobiography Known and Unknown: A Memoir. In an author's note at the start of the book, he expressly acknowledges the source of his memoir's title and mentions a few examples of his statement's prominence. The Unknown Known is the title of Errol Morris's 2013 biographical documentary film about Rumsfeld. In it, Rumsfeld initially defines "unknown knowns" as "the things you think you know, that it turns out you did not", and toward the end of the film he re-defines the term as "things that you know, that you don't know you know".

Rumsfeld's comment earned the 2003 Foot in Mouth Award from the British Plain English Campaign.

In April 2003, Slate columnist Hart Seely arranged Rumsfeld's public statements as found poetry, presenting the "unknown unknowns" passage as a poem titled "The Unknown". Seely later published a full collection, Pieces of Intelligence: The Existential Poetry of Donald H. Rumsfeld (2003). The poems were subsequently set to music by pianist Bryant Kong and performed by soprano Elender Wall.

== Historical context ==
As alluded to by Rumsfeld in his autobiography, ancient Greek philosopher Socrates considered known unknowns and unknown unknowns. Much later, philosopher and theologian Thomas Aquinas in his Summa Theologica also emphasized the important difference between recognized ignorance and unconscious ignorance.

Rumsfeld's statement closely parallelled a well-known proverb about knowledge:

He who knows not, and knows not that he knows not, is a fool. Shun him.
He who knows not, and knows that he knows not, is simple. Teach him.
He who knows, and knows not that he knows, is asleep. Wake him.
He who knows, and knows that he knows, is wise. Follow him.

This has been widely quoted since the 19th century as (for example) an anonymous Persian, Arabic, African, Japanese, Oriental or simply an old proverb, or attributed to authors ranging from Confucius to Bruce Lee. The proverb is actually a close translation (with line order reversed) of al-Khalil ibn Ahmad al-Farahidi's medieval epigram about the "four kinds of men", as reported by Al-Ghazali (1058-1111 AD), which was later echoed in poems by Nasir al-Din al-Tusi and Ibn Yamin.

"Unknown unknowns" were occasionally mentioned in the 1950s and 1960s. In 1950, it was noted that sociology research was full of "unknown unknowns". In a 1962 commencement address, Nobel laureate biochemist Melvin Calvin discussed how humanity "must grapple not only with the known and the 'known unknown', but also with the vastness of the 'unknown unknown'."

A related 2x2 grid was created in 1955 by two American psychologists, Joseph Luft and Harrington Ingham in their development of the Johari window, a "graphic model of interpersonal behaviour" that classifies knowledge about your behavior and motivations in terms of whether you or others are aware of those behaviours or motivations. For example, your motivation might be (un)known by you and (un)known by others. Another similar classification scheme is the conscious competence learning model published in 1960, where a person's knowledge and skills are classified according to how (un)conscious and (in)competent they are.

== Analytical sciences ==
The term "known unknowns" has been applied to the identification of chemical substances using analytical chemistry approaches, specifically mass spectrometry. In many cases, an unknown to an investigator that is detected in an experiment is actually known in the chemical literature, a reference database, or an Internet resource. These types of compounds are termed "known unknowns". The term was originally coined by Little et al. and reported a number of times in the literature since then as a general approach.

== See also ==
- Argument from ignorance
- Black swan theory
- Confidence interval
- Cynefin framework
- Dunning–Kruger effect
- Emic and etic
- Epistemic modal logic
- Four stages of competence
- "I know that I know nothing"
- Ignoramus et ignorabimus
- Ignotum per ignotius
- Johari window
- Kenneth Stanley
- Knightian uncertainty
- Meno's paradox
- Outlier
- Outside Context Problem
- Russell's teapot
- Tacit knowledge
- Undecidable problem
- Unintended consequences
- Wild card (foresight)
