= Patricia Benner =

American nursing theorist (born 1942)

- Born: Patricia Sawyer; Hampton, Virginia
- Education: Pasadena City College; Pasadena College; UCSF; University of California, Berkeley
- Known for: From Novice to Expert: Excellence and Power in Clinical Nursing Practice
- Awards: Living Legend of the American Academy of Nursing (2011)
- Scientific career
- Fields: Nursing theory, nursing education
- Workplaces: University of California, San Francisco (UCSF)
- Website: www.educatingnurses.com

Patricia Sawyer Benner is a nursing theorist, academic and author. She is known for one of her books, From Novice to Expert: Excellence and Power in Clinical Nursing Practice (1984). Benner described the stages of learning and skill acquisition across the careers of nurses, applying the Dreyfus model of skill acquisition to nursing practice. Benner is a professor emerita at the University of California, San Francisco UCSF School of Nursing.

== Early life ==
Benner was born Patricia Sawyer in August 1942 in Hampton, Virginia. Benner, her parents and her two sisters moved to California when she was a child. Her parents were divorced when she was in high school, which she described as a difficult event for her entire family. Benner decided to become a nurse while working in a hospital admitting department during college.

She earned an associate degree in nursing from Pasadena City College simultaneously with a bachelor's degree from Pasadena College in 1964. She married Richard Benner in 1967 and they had two children. Benner earned a master's degree in nursing from UCSF in 1970 and a PhD from the University of California, Berkeley in 1982.

== Academic career ==
Benner joined the nursing faculty at UCSF in 1982. Early in her academic career, Benner led the Achieving Methods of Intraprofessional Consensus, Assessment and Evaluation Project (AMICAE Project). She held an endowed chair at UCSF in ethics and spirituality for several years. In 2004, she became director of the Preparation for the Profession program at the Carnegie Foundation for the Advancement of Teaching. Benner is a professor emerita at the UCSF School of Nursing and is a program leader with the school's PhD program in nursing health policy.

She wrote her influential book, From Novice to Expert: Excellence and Power in Clinical Nursing Practice, in 1984, based on her work with the AMICAE Project. Benner adapted the Dreyfus model of skill acquisition to the careers of nurses. The work describes a five-stage career trajectory from novice nurse to expert. Benner's model was based on qualitative research rather than quantitative studies, which has opened it to some criticism.

Working with Judith Wrubel in 1989, Benner expanded her model to incorporate the concept of caring with the stages of skill acquisition. In addition to the influence of the Dreyfus model, the new model was inspired by the work of philosophers Maurice Merleau-Ponty and Martin Heidegger. It described four aspects of a person's understanding (the role of the situation, the role of the body, the role of temporal concerns, and the role of temporality), as well as five dimensions of the body to which nurses attend.

Benner was named a Living Legend of the American Academy of Nursing in 2011. The Living Legends designation honors individuals with "extraordinary contributions to the nursing profession, sustained over the course of their careers." In 1994, Benner was awarded honorary fellowship of the Royal College of Nursing FRCN(hon) for her contribution to nurse education.

Along with her most renowned book she also has written, Expertise in Nursing Practice: Caring, Clinical Judgement and Ethics, Clinical Wisdom and Interventions in Critical Care: A thinking-In-action Approach, and, Stress and Satisfaction on the Job: Work Meanings and Coping of Mid-Career Men.

=== From novice to expert: A nursing theory ===
Benner's novice to expert theory asserts that expert nurses develop their knowledge of patient care and extensive skill set by obtaining experiences collected over a course of time as well as having an education background. Dr. Benner's theory focuses on how nurses acquire their nursing knowledge, particularly how a nurse could gain knowledge or "know-how" without learning a theory, referred to as "know-that". The novice to expert process is one of skill acquisition and is supported as well as defined by the Dreyfus model of skill acquisition, which acts as a foundation for the theory. This model demonstrates how students gain knowledge or skills.

Benner applies this theory to the nursing profession by outlining the same five stages or levels of clinical competency: novice, advanced beginner, competent, proficient, and expert. These five levels represent an overall change in two aspects of a nurse's skills, increased independence in reliance on abstract ideas and principles and an increase in critical thinking. As one collects more concrete experiences, they are then able to use these as paradigms rather than abstract principles, which also leads to an increase in critical thinking. Experiences gained over time will enable a change in perception. Such a change in perception will then open up a new level of thinking that is based on each situation and is more holistic, rather than abstract and pieced-together knowledge that a novice might have.
