= Four stages of competence =

Psychological states when gaining a skill

The four stages of competence arranged as a pyramid

In psychology, the four stages of competence, or the "conscious competence" learning model, relates to the psychological states involved in the process of progressing from incompetence to competence in a skill. People may have several skills, some unrelated to each other, and each skill will typically be at one of the stages at a given time. Many skills require practice to remain at a high level of competence.

The four stages suggest that individuals are initially unaware of how little they know, or unconscious of their incompetence. As they recognize their incompetence, they consciously acquire a skill, then consciously use it. Eventually, the skill can be utilized without it being consciously thought through: the individual is said to have then acquired unconscious competence.

== History ==
The four stages appeared in the 1960 textbook Management of Training Programs by three management professors at New York University. Management trainer Martin M. Broadwell called the model "the four levels of teaching" in an article published in February 1969. Paul R. Curtiss and Phillip W. Warren mentioned the model in their 1973 book The Dynamics of Life Skills Coaching. The model was used at Gordon Training International by its employee Noel Burch in the 1970s; there it was called the "four stages for learning any new skill". Later the model was frequently attributed to Abraham Maslow, incorrectly since the model does not appear in his major works.

Several elements, including helping someone "know what they don't know" or recognize a blind spot, can be compared to elements of a Johari window, which was created in 1955, although Johari deals with self-awareness, while the four stages of competence deal with learning stages.

Learning stages had also been previously identified by T. Earl Pardoe, who in 1923 noted that mastering any art requires progressing from unconscious ignorance through conscious ignorance and knowledge, and then finally to a state where all required techniques have become unconscious knowledge.

== Stages ==
The four stages are:

1. Unconscious incompetence
  The individual does not understand or know how to do something and does not necessarily recognize the deficit. They may deny the usefulness of the skill. The individual must recognize their own incompetence, and the value of the new skill, before moving on to the next stage. The length of time an individual spends in this stage depends on the strength of the stimulus to learn.
2. Conscious incompetence
  Though the individual does not understand or know how to do something, they recognize the deficit, as well as the value of a new skill in addressing the deficit. The making of mistakes can be integral to the learning process at this stage.
3. Conscious competence
  The individual understands or knows how to do something. It may be broken down into steps, and there is heavy conscious involvement in executing the new skill. However, demonstrating the skill or knowledge requires concentration, and if it is broken, they lapse into incompetence.
4. Unconscious competence
  The individual has had so much practice with a skill that it has become "second nature" and can be performed easily. As a result, the skill can be performed while executing another task. The individual may be able to teach it to others, depending upon how and when it was learned.

== See also ==
- Bloom's taxonomy – Classification system in education
- Decision theory – Branch of applied probability theory
  - Grand strategy – Long-term strategy employed by a nation to further its interests
- Dreyfus model of skill acquisition – Model of learning
- Dunning–Kruger effect – Cognitive bias about one's own skill
- Erikson's stages of psychosocial development – Eight-stage model of psychoanalytic development
- Flow – Full immersion in an activity
- Formula for change – Model of organisational change
- Illusory superiority – Cognitive bias
- Immunity to change – Method of self-reflection and mindset change
- Instructional scaffolding – Support given to a student by an instructor
- Learning styles – Largely debunked theories that aim to account for differences in individuals' learning
- Motivation – Inner state causing goal-directed behavior
- SECI model of knowledge dimensions – Model of knowledge creation
- Solution-focused brief therapy – Goal-directed approach to psychotherapy
- Theory of multiple intelligences – Educational model of human intelligence
- Transtheoretical model, also known as Stages of change – Integrative theory of therapy
- Zone of proximal development – Difference between what a learner can do without help and what they can do with help
