= Known and Unknown: A Memoir =

2011 autobiographical book by Donald Rumsfeld

- Author: Donald Rumsfeld
- Language: English
- Subject: Memoir, U.S. military history, U.S. politics
- Publisher: Penguin Group USA
- Publication date: February 8, 2011
- Publication place: United States
- Media type: Print
- Pages: 726
- ISBN: 978-1-59523-067-6

Known and Unknown: A Memoir is an autobiographical book by Donald Rumsfeld published through Penguin Group USA in February 2011. It covers a variety of his experiences such as serving as a member of the United States House of Representatives in the late 60s, as a member of the Nixon and Ford administrations during the Watergate scandal and Vietnam War, and as George W. Bush's secretary of defense at the onset of the war on terror.

Rumsfeld makes a variety of statements about his positions meant to, in his view, correct the record. For example, he states that he always opposed using waterboarding during interrogations, and he argues that the Abu Ghraib detainee abuse scandal constituted one of his biggest personal regrets. He recounts having delivered his resignation but that the president didn't accept it, with Rumsfeld writing that his failure to demand being released from his job "was a misjudgment". In terms of commercial reception, the book was listed as number one on The New York Times Best Seller list for hardcover nonfiction, and number three for E-book nonfiction, on February 27, 2011.

The book received several notable critical reviews. These have ranged from general support from publications such as City Journal, where Victor Davis Hanson argued that "the onus shifts back onto Rumsfeld's critics to prove him wrong or disingenuous", to condemnation from publications such as The Huffington Post and The Financial Times, the latter in which ran comments by Andrew Bacevich panning the work as "tendentious rather than instructive". Rumsfeld donated the profits from the book's sale to veterans' charities.

== Background ==
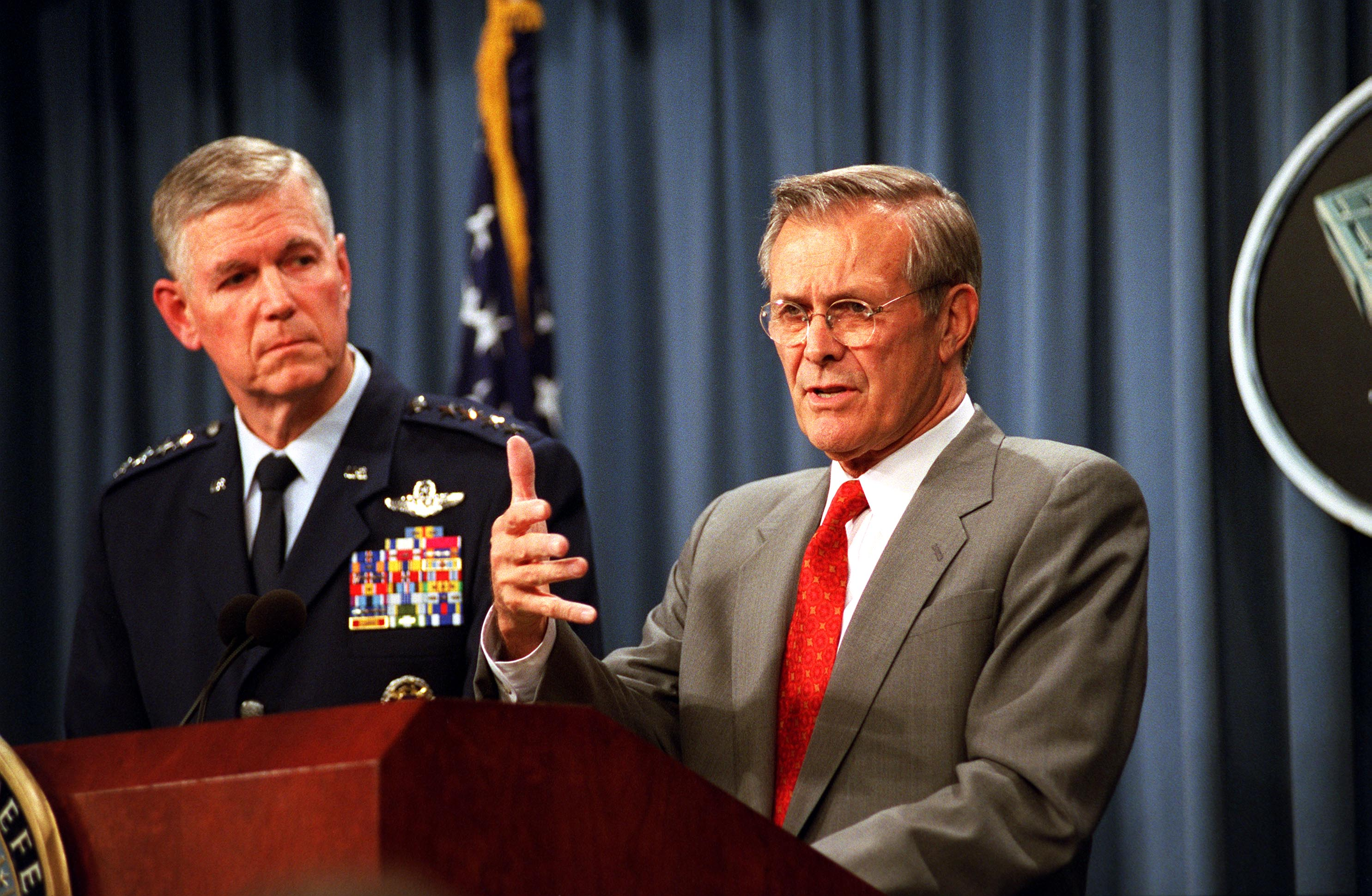
Rumsfeld with the chairman of the Joint Chiefs of Staff, Richard B. Myers at a Pentagon press conference in February 2002

As Rumsfeld acknowledged in an "Author's Note" at the start of the book, the title, "Known and Unknown," is a play on his famous remark in a February 12, 2002 press conference:

Reports that say that something hasn't happened are always interesting to me, because, as we know, there are known knowns; there are things we know that we know. There are known unknowns. That is to say, there are things that we now know we don't know. But there are also unknown unknowns. There are things we do not know we don't know.

Rumsfeld aide Keith Urbahn said pre-release on September 20, 2010,

The memoir follows the historical arc of Rumsfeld's career, from his childhood experience of Pearl Harbor to the aftermath of 9/11... This book will tell readers things that they didn't know, and it may well unsettle a few people who think the history of certain events has already been written.

In the press conference when Rumsfeld first used the phrase, he was responding to a question by reporter Jim Miklaszewski about evidence of Iraq supplying terrorists with weapons of mass destruction. While some dismissed Rumsfeld statement as non-answer (compare Mu (negative))— not just an evasion or a misdirection, the statement has been quoted and dealt with in various blogs, books and scientific papers. Daase and Kessler (2007) agree with the aspect of both knowledge and non-knowledge as being equally constitutive for political decisionmaking. They assume that the cognitive frame for political practice is determined by the relationship between what we know, what we do not know, what we cannot know and (according to the authors, being left out by Rumsfeld) what we do not like to know.

== Book contents ==
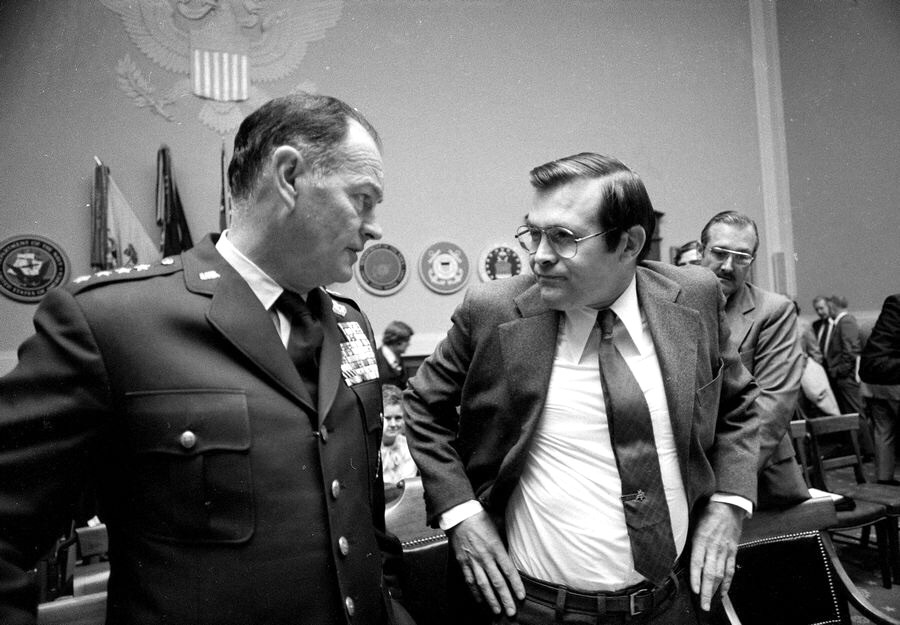
Donald Rumsfeld during his first tenure as Secretary of Defense, from 1975 to 1977, with Chairman of the Joint Chiefs of Staff General George S. Brown during testimony at Senate Armed Services Committee on January 15, 1976. The book center much of Rumsfeld's early life and early political career, from his career as Illinois's 13th district Congressman until his second tenure as Secretary of Defense from 2001 to 2006.

The cover depicts Rumsfeld during a get-away trip to Taos, which journalist Ben Smith has suggested conveys the notion of being "detached from the Beltway". Rumsfeld begins the book by recounting his famous 1983 meeting with Iraqi strongman Saddam Hussein. He recalls that Hussein said that the nation of France "understood the Iraqi view". Rumsfeld writes, "That particular remark came to my mind on more than one occasion and I never had cause to doubt it." He states that Hussein came across as "rather reasonable". However, he reports that Hussein repeated word for word a line Rumsfeld had used the day before in another meeting— leading Rumsfeld to conclude that he was bugged. Rumsfeld recounts his childhood, with his ex-military father making a living selling real estate near Chicago, Illinois. He discusses becoming an Eagle Scout, wrestling in high-school, and then serving in the Naval Reserve Officer Training Corps to help him get through college. He also mentions, after graduation, his tour as a naval aviator and marrying his high school sweetheart.

He recalls heading back to his native Chicago and being elected to the U.S. House in 1962—at age 29. He notes voting for the Civil Rights Act of 1964 and the Gulf of Tonkin Resolution. As the Vietnam War drags on, he describes growing dissatisfied with the Johnson administration's policies—particularly the use of drafted soldiers and the expansion of troop levels on the ground. Rumsfeld discusses his advocacy of "Vietnamization", which he tries to implement under President Nixon. He blames Congress for the South Vietnamese regime's final collapse and views the outcome as a "withdrawal" and "retreat".

Rumsfeld recalls how his career led him and his wife to develop a lifetime friendship with media and entertainment personality Sammy Davis Jr. He recounts visiting Redskins games and becoming a huge fan of Elvis Presley. Rumsfeld reveals that, backstage in a Las Vegas concert late one night, Presley pulled him aside to express thanks to the U.S. armed forces. Rumsfeld writes that "patriots can be found anywhere".

He details his four decade long friendship and alliance with Dick Cheney. Rumsfeld recounts, serving as President Gerald Ford's chief of staff, bringing in Cheney as an assistant to the president. He states that Cheney has been his doppelgänger of sorts due to their mutual Ivy League backgrounds and successes as major corporate CEOs, among other things.

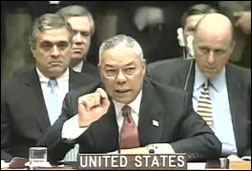
Secretary of State Colin Powell holds a model anthrax vial while telling the UN in February 2003 that Iraq was stockpiling weapons of mass destruction (WMD).

Rumsfeld recalls his service as President Ronald Reagan's Middle East envoy at the time the U.S. pulled out of Lebanon. He states that the situation and its aftermath showed him that American weakness (whether real or merely perceived) is provocative. He describes developing a strategic perspective that U.S. foreign policy should be "forward-leaning".

Rumsfeld shakes hands with Saddam Hussein in December 1983.

He criticizes Secretary of State Colin Powell for promoting the decision taken by President George H. W. Bush not to remove Saddam Hussein from power after the 1991 Gulf War. He flatly takes the opposite view. Rumsfeld additionally describes Powell as the representative of State Department views to Bush rather than the other way around.

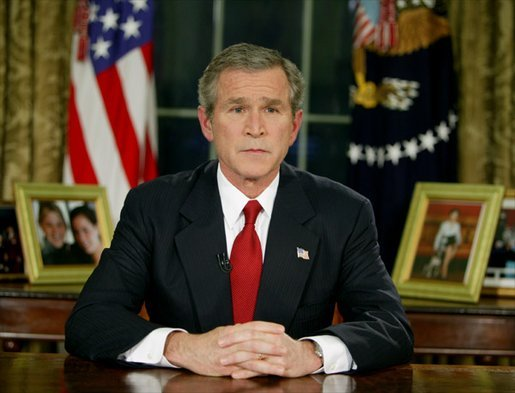
President Bush announces the beginning of the invasion of Iraq War on March 19, 2003.

Rumsfeld recounts his distance from George H. W. Bush during the Ford and Reagan administrations, which included personal differences and differences in opinion for appointments and political endorsements. He describes himself as skeptical of the experiences of "those who enjoy the inherited benefit of prominent names." However, he ends up forging a close relationship with George W. Bush. Rumsfeld labels the younger Bush "decidedly down-to-earth, with no inclination to formality" with a "demeanor... different from his father's somewhat patrician manner."

He details his efforts to move the Defense Department away from its traditional emphasis on expensive, long-standing weapons systems towards a system based on lighter, mobile, and autonomous forces. He recounts his turf disputes that came up while enacting reforms. The dramatics over canceling the $11 billion Crusader artillery platform are highlighted.

He describes being in the Pentagon when the hijacked American Airlines Flight 77 slammed into it on September 11, 2001. He recounts staying at his post amid the rubble and groping to determine the significance of the attack. He also remarks that the targeted sectors of the Pentagon were undergoing refurbishment (with many offices unoccupied) and thus many lives were spared.

Rumsfeld discusses the longtime problems of his son, Nick, with drug addiction. He recalls when his son checked into a rehab clinic shortly after 9/11, and Rumsfeld, overcome with emotion, breaks down in a meeting with Bush in the Oval Office. He writes, "I had not imagined I might choke up... at that moment George W Bush wasn't just the president. He was a compassionate human being who had a sense of what Joyce and I were going through." Rumsfeld states that Bush rose from the presidential desk to put his arm around him in understanding.

Rumsfeld recounts the president inviting him into the Oval Office just fifteen days after the 9/11 attacks and the president then ordering a review of war plans for Iraq. He writes that Bush called for "creative" ideas, but "[t]wo weeks after the worst terror attacks in our nation's history, those of us in the Department of Defense were full[y] occupied". Additionally, he describes how Hussein targeted his family as well as the president's for reprisal attacks. He mentions that the dictator left a $60 million bounty, and that pictures of Bush's daughters later surfaced in Uday Hussein's palace.

Rumsfeld states that he has been opposed to the Defense Department ever using waterboarding during interrogations. He details the Abu Ghraib detainee abuse scandal and the public exposure of photographs of American soldiers abusing prisoners, which he calls one of his biggest personal regrets. Rumsfeld recounts asking President Bush to accept his resignation and how Bush repeatedly refused. He writes that staying at the president's request "was a misjudgment on my part."

He defends his policy of placing detainees in Guantanamo Bay prison, writing,

I was perfectly willing to shutter the facility if a better alternative could have been found that would be as effective in obtaining intelligence and preventing terrorists from returning to the fight. But no alternative to Gitmo was proposed.

He asserts about Bush administration reports of weapons of mass destruction in Iraq,

Powell was not duped or misled by anybody, nor did he lie about Saddam's suspected WMD stockpiles. The President did not lie. The Vice President did not lie... the far less dramatic truth is that we were wrong.

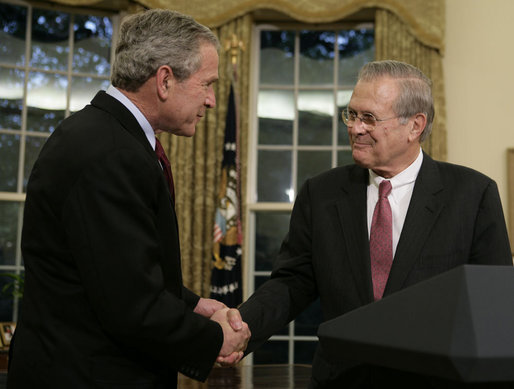
President Bush and Rumsfeld shake hands after Bush announces Rumsfeld's resignation in November 2006.

While writing that he regrets that no significant stockpiles of weapons were found, Rumsfeld defends the invasion. He states that the Mideast would be "far more perilous" with Hussein, and he states that Bush's "aggressive, unrelenting offensive against the enemy" has prevented another 9/11-style attack. He argues as well that Hussein's regime had fostered links with al-Qaeda and had an active WMD program in northern Iraq.

Rumsfeld praises Bush's response to Hurricane Katrina, and he states that the military response was swifter than any previous handling of an American natural disaster.

Rumsfeld argues that while he was a "latecomer" in supporting the Iraqi troop 'surge', he still felt open to changing policy. He states that until 2006, Generals Tommy Franks, Ricardo Sanchez, George Casey, and John Abizaid had all assured him that increasing troop levels would not help the situation. Rumsfeld points out that he signed off on General David Petraeus' appointment before his departure.

He expresses doubts about further escalating U.S. involvement in Afghanistan. He argues that more troops will not help with the nation's problems but may in fact make matters worse. He writes specifically that more troops could create "resentment among a proud population" and also give "more targets for our enemies to attack."

He concludes the book by arguing that President Barack Obama has largely "kept in place the most contentious and widely derided Bush administration policies" such as holding people in Guantanamo Bay, charging internees in military commissions rather than civilian courts, and continuing drone attacks abroad.

== Reviews ==
Military historian Victor Davis Hanson wrote in City Journal that Rumsfeld "is as candid and unapologetic in retirement as he was in government and corporate service". He generally praised Rumsfeld's depiction of the Bush years while also asking why Rumsfeld was unwilling to change strategy after 2003 as the Iraqi insurgency expanded. Hanson also remarked that "[w]ith the publication of Known and Unknown, the onus shifts back onto Rumsfeld's critics to prove him wrong or disingenuous".

Journalist Justin Webb commented for The Observer that "Rumsfeld comes out fighting", and Webb criticized Rumsfeld for ignoring issues such as internees "wrongly imprisoned" in Guantánamo. Webb concluded:

We needed more insight, more sense of detachment, for this book to match the achievements of its author. A mere reminder of why those press conferences were fun to watch is hardly enough.

The Economist referred to the memoir as "a fascinating history" and "a good read" as well as "interesting and even enjoyable". The news-magazine also stated that Rumsfeld, predictably, avoided self-criticism. "The quagmires in Iraq and Afghanistan, it appears, were everyone's fault but his", commented the review.

In The Huffington Post, journalist Marcus Baram stated that Rumsfeld blamed "almost everyone else for mistakes that were made" and ends in a "self-satisfying" way. He also wrote, "Notably missing from the book is any mention of Pat Tillman, the football star turned soldier whose death by friendly fire was covered up by the Pentagon."

Author and history professor Andrew Bacevich panned the book in The Financial Times, writing:

Known and Unknown is tendentious rather than instructive. The reader who wades in should expect a long, hard slog, with little likelihood of emerging on the far side appreciably enlightened. Rather than seriously contemplating the implications of the events in which he participated, Rumsfeld spends more than 800 pages dodging them.

Jonathan Powell, who served as chief of staff to British Prime Minister Tony Blair at the same time as Rumsfeld's tenure under Bush, disparaged the memoir in The New Statesman. He remarked that Rumsfeld reminded him of a reactionary Bourbon monarch after the French restoration. Powell also asserted that Rumsfeld made "no revelations of importance" and wrote with a "relentless desire always to be right" that is "deeply off-putting". Powell wrote (quoting Talleyrand) that Rumsfeld had "learned nothing and forgotten nothing".

== See also ==
- Abu Ghraib torture and prisoner abuse
- Baghdad Central Prison
- Electoral history of Donald Rumsfeld
- Gerald Ford
- George H. W. Bush
- George W. Bush
- Guantanamo Bay detention camp
- Hamdan v. Rumsfeld
- Iraq War
- List of autobiographies
- National Security Strategy (United States)
- Overseas interventions of the United States
- 'There are known knowns'
- The Unknown Known
- United States Secretary of Defense

== Related memoirs ==
- A Journey by Tony Blair
- At the Center of the Storm: My Years at the CIA by George Tenet
- Decision Points by George W. Bush
- In My Time: A Personal and Political Memoir by Dick Cheney
- Spoken from the Heart by Laura Bush
