= Socratic paradox =

The term Socratic paradox may refer to several seemingly paradoxical claims made by the ancient Greek philosopher Socrates:

- I know that I know nothing, a saying that is sometimes (somewhat inaccurately) attributed to Socrates
- Socratic intellectualism, the view that nobody ever knowingly does wrong
