= Shuhari =

Concept describing the stages of learning

Shuhari written in kanji

Shuhari (Japanese: 守破離) is a Japanese concept that describes the stages of learning to mastery. Shuhari is usually translated as "follow the rules, break the rules, transcend the rules". This specific phrasing is usually attributed to Sen no Rikyū, a 16th century tea master and poet. It has been applied to other disciplines, such as Go, Japanese martial arts, Noh theatre, and more.

== History ==
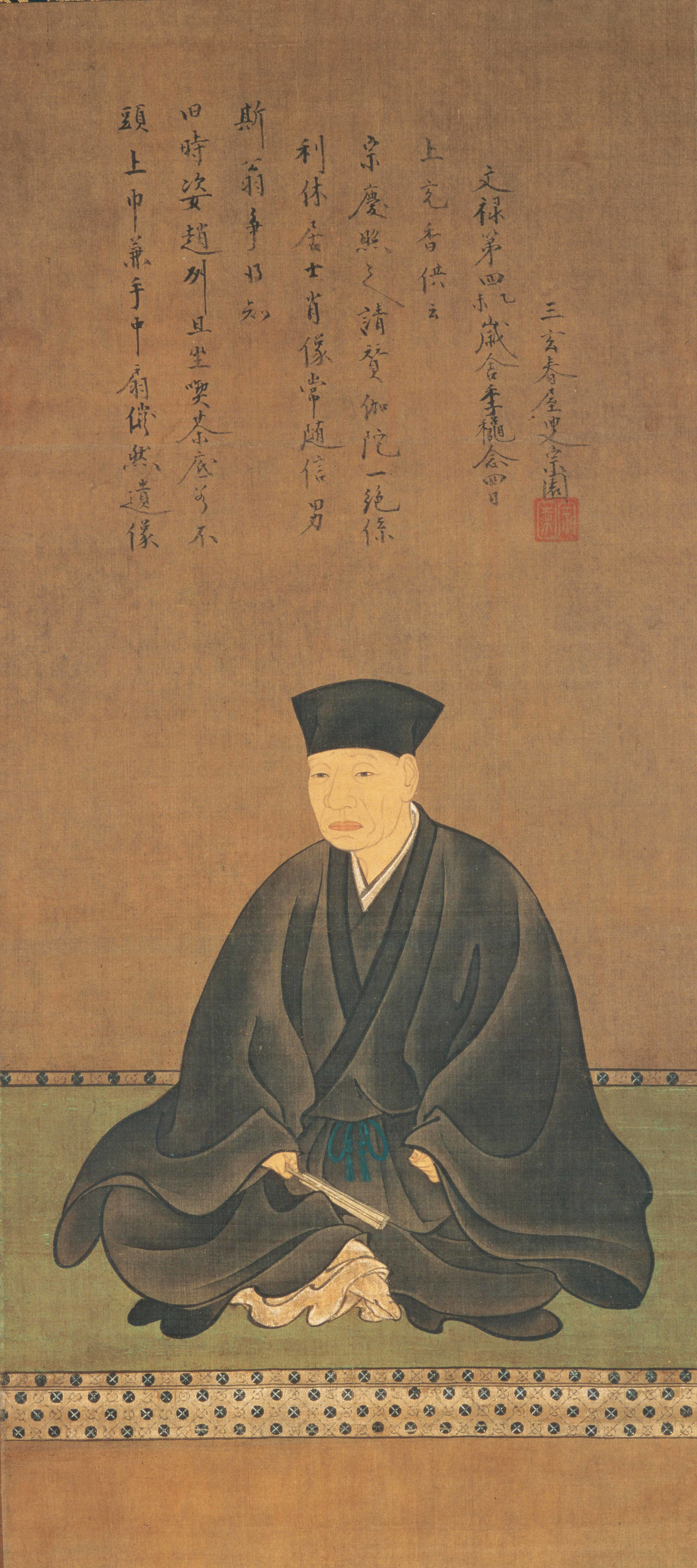
Sen no Rikyū, who greatly influenced chanoyu thought in sadō (Japanese tea ceremony) in the 16th century

This specific phrasing is usually attributed to Sen no Rikyū from the phrase 「規矩作法 守り尽くして破るとも離るるとても本を忘るな」in one of his poems. The Shuhari concept was presented by Fuhaku Kawakami, a 19th century tea master, to the wider public. Fuhaku based his process from the works of Zeami Motokiyo, the master of Noh, which then became a part of the philosophy of Aikido.

== Definition ==
Shuhari roughly translates to "to keep, to fall, to break away" or "follow the rules, break the rules, transcend the rules". Aikido master Endō Seishirō stated:

"It is known that, when we learn or train in something, we pass through the stages of shu, ha, and ri. These stages are explained as follows. In shu, we repeat the forms and discipline ourselves so that our bodies absorb the forms that our forebears created. We remain faithful to these forms with no deviation. Next, in the stage of ha, once we have disciplined ourselves to acquire the forms and movements, we make innovations. In this process the forms may be broken and discarded. Finally, in ri, we completely depart from the forms, open the door to creative technique, and arrive in a place where we act in accordance with what our heart/mind desires, unhindered while not overstepping laws."

Shuhari can be decomposed in 3 kanjis:

Kanji	English translation	Explanation	Reference
Shu (守)	"Protect", "obey"	Traditional wisdom - learning fundamentals, techniques, heuristics, proverbs.	
Ha (破)	"Detach", "digress"	Breaking with tradition - detachment from the illusions of self, to break with tradition - to find exceptions to traditional wisdom, to find new approaches. In some styles of Japanese music (gagaku and noh), it is also the middle of the song.	
Ri (離)	"leave", "separate"	Transcendence—there are no techniques or proverbs, all moves are natural, becoming one with spirit alone without clinging to forms; transcending the physical - there is no traditional technique or wisdom, all movements are allowed.	

Shuhari can be considered as concentric circles, with Shu within Ha, and both Shu and Ha within Ri. The fundamental techniques and knowledge do not change.

During the Shu phase the student should loyally follow the instruction of a single teacher; the student is not yet ready to explore and compare different paths.

== See also ==
- Dreyfus model of skill acquisition
