= Dreyfus model of skill acquisition =

Model of learning

The Dreyfus Model of Skill Acquisition, or the Dreyfus Skill Model, describes distinct stages learners pass through as they acquire new skills. It has been used in fields such as education, nursing, operations research, and many more.

== History ==
Brothers Stuart and Hubert Dreyfus originally proposed the model in 1980 in an 18-page report on their research at the University of California, Berkeley, Operations Research Center for the United States Air Force Office of Scientific Research. The model was elaborated in more detail in their book Mind Over Machine (1986/1988). A more recent articulation, "Revisiting the Six Stages of Skill Acquisition," authored by Stuart E. Dreyfus and B. Scot Rousse, appears in a volume exploring the relevance of the Skill Model: Teaching and Learning for Adult Skill Acquisition: Applying the Dreyfus and Dreyfus Model in Different Fields (2021). The contributions to this volume attest to the wide variety of domains in which the Skill Model has been both corroborated and influential.

== Overview ==
The Dreyfus Skill Model proposes that a student passes through five distinct stages of novice, advanced beginner, competence, proficiency, and expertise, with a sixth stage of mastery available for highly motivated and talented performers.

Animating the Skill Model is a common experience. In acquiring new skills, students must first rely on rules and procedures while deliberately figuring out what to do. As they gain experience and progress towards expertise, students gradually let go of the rules and procedures while gaining the ability to act fluidly, without making decisions or deliberating.

Rules and procedures provide students with an initial basic footing. In an unfamiliar new domain, students attend to features of the situation that can be noticed without prior experience, what the Skill Model calls "context-free features." Think of the read-outs on the speedometer, tachometer and other gauges in an automobile, or of the objective measurements of ingredients and cooking times in a recipe.

As learners progress through the stages and gain experience, they begin to see beyond context-free features and begin to act without appealing to the rules. Experts act intuitively from a direct, holistic discrimination of their situation.

Expert drivers do not note that there is a curve ahead, recall and apply the rule that one should decelerate to 20mph when entering a curve, and then apply a further rule in order to decide whether to hit the brake or lift their foot from the accelerator; rather they "feel in the seat of their pants" when they should slow down and they can immediately tell if this is a situation that calls for hitting the brakes rather than just easing off the accelerator.

Having successfully navigated many similar situations, the expert driver can also smoothly adjust to sudden, unexpected changes in the situation like a light turning red, or the appearance of water on the road. The Skill Model calls this "reflexive reorientation."

== The Primacy of Intuition Over Rules and Procedures ==
The Skill Model refers to the direct, holistic discrimination of what a situation calls for as the performer's "intuition" or "intuitive perspective." The emergence of an intuitive perspective, a direct sense of what is relevant and called for in a given situation, characterizes stages four and five of the Skill Model (proficiency and expertise).

Novice cooks will appeal step-by-step to the rules, procedures, and objective measurements of a recipe as they haltingly figure out a dish to make with the unfamiliar contents of a cupboard. However, "the expert cook, presented with an array of ingredients and kitchen appliances, can see immediately a range of dishes that are possible to create with them, understand the order in which to approach the stages of preparation, and set directly to work prepping the initial ingredients and calibrating the relevant kitchen appliances." Proficient cooks will intuitively see a meal to make, but will still need to deliberate and decide specific actions according to rules and procedures as they prepare the meal.

An over-reliance on the conscious application of rules and procedures leads a learner to stall at the stage of competence and prevents intuitive perspectives from emerging. According to the Skill Model, to advance to proficiency and expertise, the learner must take the risk of letting go of the application of rules and procedures, thus involving themselves more directly and emotionally in the outcome of their actions.

Having gained extensive experience across a variety of situations, experts act intuitively, without reflective decision-making. As Dreyfus and Dreyfus put it in Mind Over Machine: “when things are proceeding normally, experts don’t solve problems and don’t make decisions; they do what normally works." Immersed in the flow of their situation, experts allow themselves to be guided by the repertoire of intuitive perspectives they have acquired through training and experience.

The sixth stage, mastery, was added later by Dreyfus and Dreyfus. Masters, not content with conventional expertise, seek to expand the scope of their intuition. In some cases they introduce new ways of doing things that open new possibilities and transform the style of their skill domain.

== The Dreyfus Skill Model ==
The following summary is based upon Rousse and Dreyfus, "Revisiting the Six Stages of Skill Acquisition."

Stage 1: Novice

Novices rely heavily on context-free rules and step-by-step instructions. Their performance tends to be slow, clumsy, and requires conscious effort. Novices struggle to adapt when situations don't align with the instructions. A novice cook strictly follows recipe measurements and timing, regardless of variations in ingredients or peculiarities of the oven. A novice driver might rigidly maintain speed limits without considering traffic flow or the presence of pedestrians. Novices have a detached approach to outcomes. To progress, novices need to keep gaining experience and making mistakes in a variety of situations.

Stage 2: Advanced Beginner

Advanced beginners recognize situation-specific nuances and can apply experience-based maxims beyond general rules. For instance, an advanced beginner cook might adjust heat based on the smell and look of the food as it is cooking rather than just the instructions in the recipe. They have had enough experience to recognize the smell of burning oil and can now apply the maxim that “the smell of burning oil usually means the heat is too high.” An advanced beginner chess player begins to recognize such aspects of situation such as "weakened king’s side” and can apply the maxim to “attack a weakened king’s side.” The performance of an advanced beginner is more sophisticated than novice, but it is still analytical. They continue to struggle with unfamiliar situations. At the same time, they begin to feel more emotionally engaged, often becoming overwhelmed or frustrated. Progression requires building further emotional involvement and commitment to outcomes.

Stage 3: Competence

Competent performers choose specific goals and adopt an overall perspective on what their situation calls for. A competent cook can choose to have the cold dishes ready before the hot ones. A competent chess player could choose an attacking strategy, focusing on the moves and pieces that support this plan. Success and failure now partially depend on the performer’s choice of perspective and not just on how well they follow rules. This leads to higher emotional involvement, with competent performers feeling joy or regret according to the outcomes. While more fluid than advanced beginners, competent performance still proceeds by analysis, calculation, and deliberate rule-following. Competent performers show improved coordination and anticipation but may rigidly stick to chosen perspectives even when circumstances change. To advance to proficiency, more risks need to be taken with letting go of rules and procedures while trusting one’s emerging intuition.

Stage 4: Proficiency

Proficient performers intuitively grasp what a situation calls for but consciously decide responses. When a perspective intuitively occurs to them, proficient nurses can instantly sense a patient's deterioration before vital signs change. However, they then deliberately consider treatment options. Proficient drivers instinctively tell they're going too fast on a rainy curve but then consciously decide whether to brake or decelerate. Proficient performers adapt better to changing circumstances but still rely on rule-based decision-making for actions. The transition to expertise requires further letting go of rules and procedures while gaining more direct experience, thereby learning which intuited perspectives work in which kind of situation.

Stage 5: Expertise

Experts demonstrate seamless integration of perception and action. An expert chef creates dishes without recipes, intuitively adjusting techniques and ingredients based on specific circumstances. Expert drivers intuitively lift their foot off the accelerator rather than braking. Their performance happens without deliberation or decision-making. Experts often struggle to precisely explain their actions. When circumstances abruptly change, experts smoothly adapt and shift perspectives in a "reflexive reorientation." For example, expert nurses constantly attend to subtle transitions in a patient’s condition. They intuitively shift perspectives and initiate a corresponding shift in treatment when solicited by transitions in the patient’s condition.

Stage 6: Mastery

Masters seek to expand and refine their repertoire of intuitive perspectives. In doing so, they sometimes create new possibilities of performing and transform the style of their domain. For example, Cézanne expanded the possibilities for the painting of form and perspective, Stephen Curry altered the style of play in basketball by making the 3-point shot central rather than marginal, and B.B. King transformed the space of possibilities in music by harnessing the previously marginal capacity of the electric guitar to sustain notes. Masters identify overlooked aspects of a practice and experiment with new approaches, accepting short-term drops in particular performances for long-term expansions in their intuition.

Table 1: Five Stages of Skill Acquisition

Skill Level	Components	Perspective	Action	Commitment
1. Novice	Context-free	None	Analytic	Detached
2. Advanced beginner	Context-free and situational	None	Analytic	Detached
3. Competent	Context-free and situational	Chosen	Analytic	Detached choice of saliences and of action; involved in outcome
4. Proficient	Situational and context-free	Experienced	Analytic	Involved experience of saliences; detached choice of action
5. Expert	Situational and context-free	Experienced	Intuitive	Involved

== Criticism of the model ==
A criticism of Dreyfus and Dreyfus's model has been provided by Gobet and Chassy, who also propose an alternative theory of intuition. According to these authors, there is no empirical evidence for the presence of stages in the development of expertise. In addition, while the model argues that analytic thinking does not play any role with experts, who act only intuitively, there is much evidence that experts in fact often carry out relatively slow problem-solving (e.g. look-ahead search in chess).

However, the above criticisms are based on a tendentious reading of the published record. For example, the criticisms fail to take into account the notion of the “deliberative rationality” of experts, which is a kind of expert reflection in action, as developed in Dreyfus and Dreyfus, Mind Over Machine and further elaborated by Rousse and Dreyfus in "Revisiting the Six Stages of Skill Acquisition."

In turn, the challenge posed by look-ahead search in chess is addressed within the scope of the skill model in a 1982 article by Stuart Dreyfus. With respect to the question of experts calculating into the future, Dreyfus argues that chess is not a suitable example from which to generalize about skillful action at large: "The DeGroot reference to the well-known practice of the chess player of calculating out into the future should not be interpreted as evidence that skilled decision-makers in other domains do likewise. This examination of possible futures becomes feasible in chess because the objective and complete nature of a chess position makes a future position as intuitively meaningful as a present one" (p. 151).

== See also ==
- Dreyfus' critique of artificial intelligence
- Patricia Benner
- Merleau Ponty
- Chris Argyris' concepts of Action learning
- Four stages of competence
- Skill
- Shu Ha Ri
- Language proficiency, particularly ACTFL Proficiency Guidelines
- Bloom's taxonomy
