= Chrissie Maher =

British plain English activist (born 1938)

Chrissie Maher OBE (born 1938) co-founded Plain English Campaign, a company that promotes the clear use of English, particularly by businesses and official bodies. Chrissie was inspired both by the need for democratic language (information that could be understood by adults of all educational levels) and plain language champions such as Sir Ernest Gowers and George Orwell.

== Biography ==
Chrissie Maher was born the fifth of six children of her parents and grew up in Pringle Street, Tuebrook, a poor area of Liverpool. She largely missed out on formal education and could not read until she was in her mid‑teens. At fourteen, she started working as a clerk in an insurance company. Her first employer paid for her to go to night school. After that, she worked at a sewing factory and as a receptionist/telephonist.

During the 1960s, she became heavily involved in community work. By 1971, she was married with four children and still living in Tuebrook. She knew that there were many adults like her who had not had the chance to learn to read and write properly and decided to help these semi-literate people who were desperately short of money to fill benefit forms.

In 1971, Maher founded the UK's first community newspaper, the Tuebrook Bugle, which gave her the chance to write articles demanding that organisations start using plain English. In 1974, Maher started The Liverpool News, the UK's first newspaper for adults with reading difficulties. Many of the plain English principles that would eventually inspire the Plain English Campaign were put into early action with both The Tuebrook Bugle and The Liverpool News. Chrissie was also a member of the UK's National Consumer Council. She remained on the NCC until 1979 and it was during this time that she started the Salford Form Market to help people fill in forms, which led to the birth of Plain English Campaign.

Maher officially launched Plain English Campaign at a demonstration in London in 1979.

In 1994, as an example of the linguistic issues she found objectionable, Maher pointed out that Britain's National Health Service published a definition of the term bed that used 229 words. Tom McArthur, editor of the Oxford Companion to the English Language said, "In all the history of the language, there has never been such a powerful grassroots movement to influence it as the Plain English Campaign."

== Awards & honours ==
- 1993 Officer of the Order of the British Empire.
- 1995 Manchester University honorary MA degree.
- 1997 Open University honorary doctorate.
- 2000 Maher, disability rights campaigner Lord Morris of Manchester, and World Wide Web creator Tim Berners-Lee were named "Information Pioneers of the Century" by the UK's National Information Forum.
- 2010 Liverpool John Moores University Honorary Fellowship for services to communication.
- 2010 Public Affairs Achiever of the Year and Outstanding Achiever of the Year from the 'Women in Public Life' awards.

== See also ==
- Simple English Wikipedia
- Golden Bull Award
- 1971: The Alternative Press | Man Alive | BBC Archive (From 18:38, segment about the Tuebrook Bugle and interview with Chrissie Maher)
