= 1976 Republican National Convention =

Political convention of the Republican Party

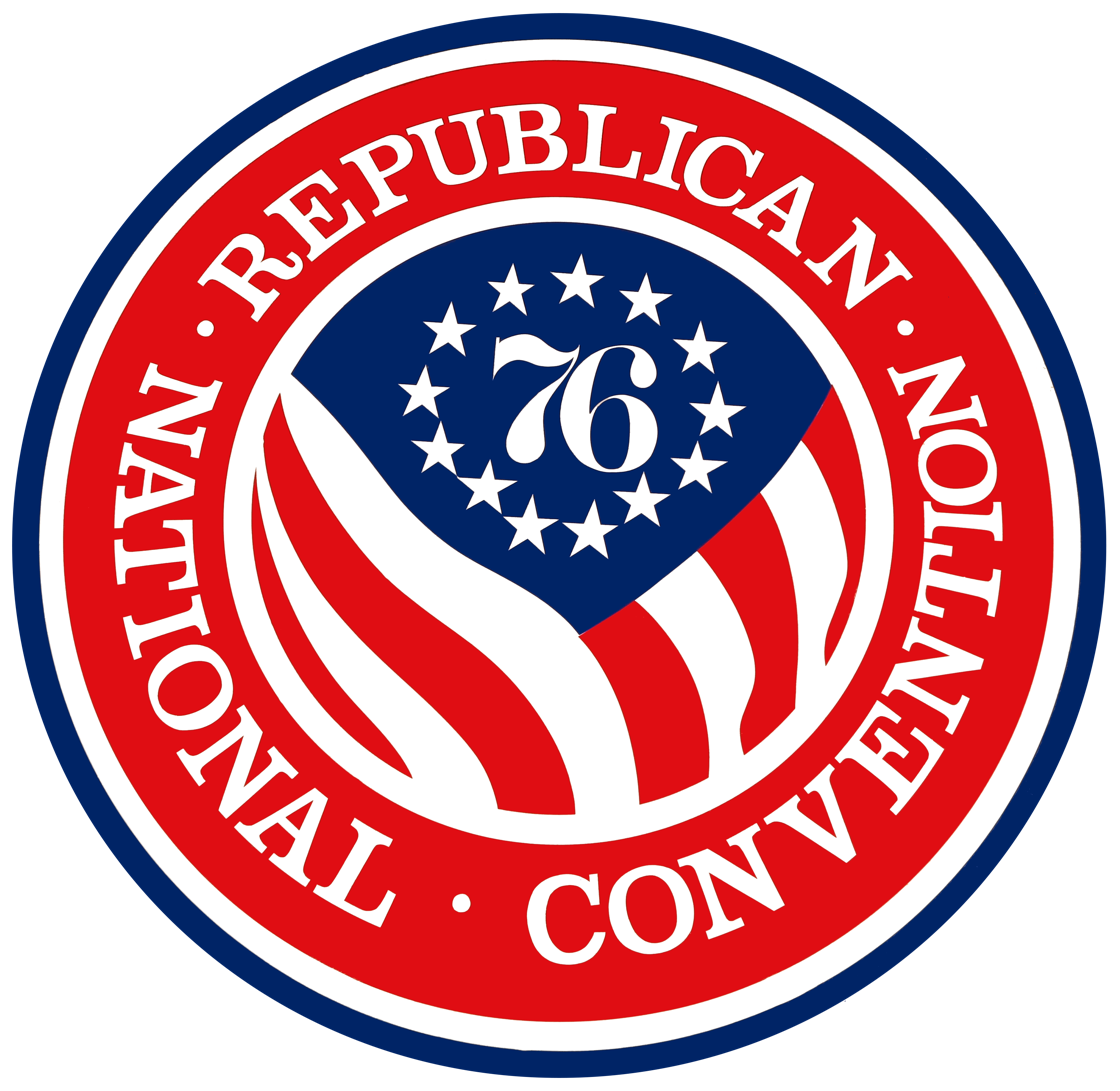
- 1976 presidential election

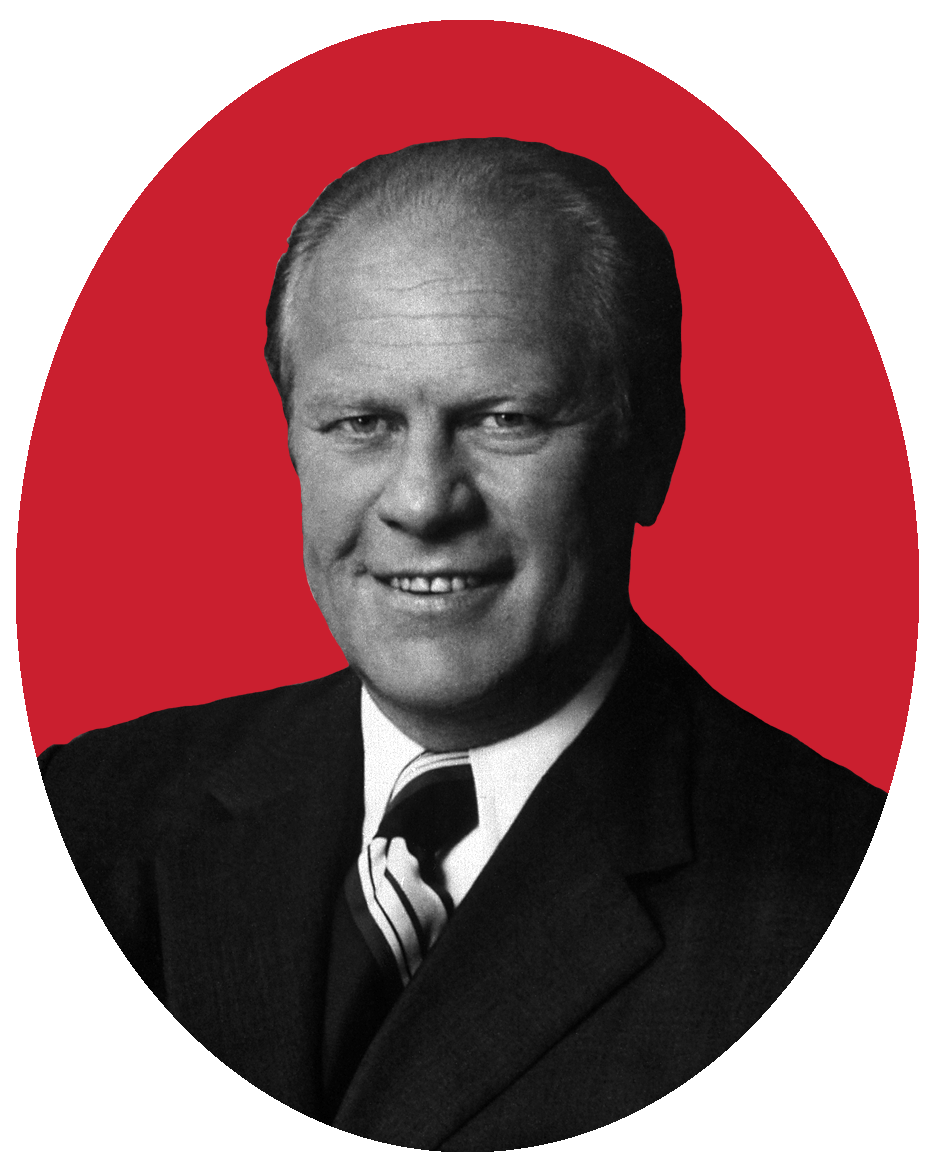
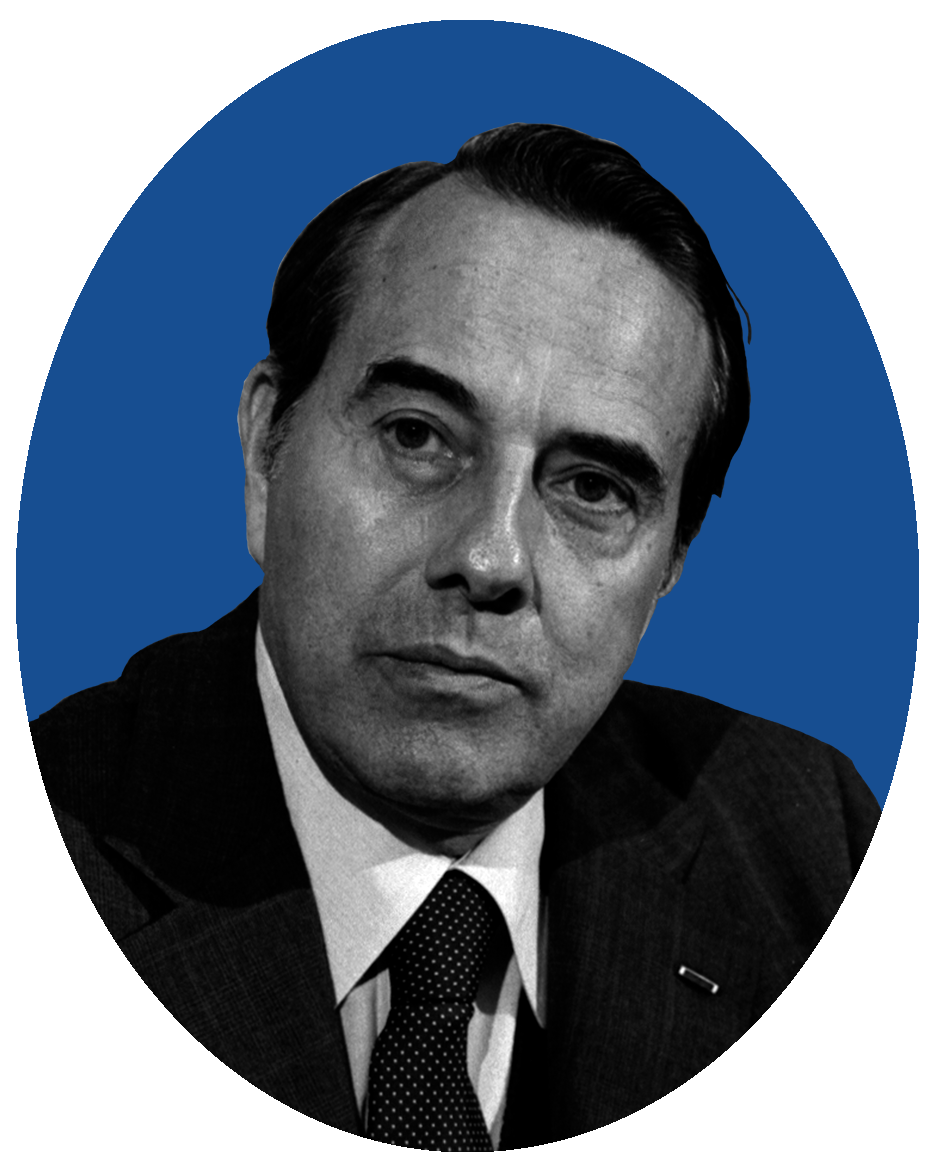
- Nominees; Ford and Dole

Convention
- Dates: August 16–19, 1976
- City: Kansas City, Missouri, U.S.
- Venue: Kemper Arena

Candidates
- Presidential nominee: Gerald Ford of Michigan
- Vice-presidential nominee: Bob Dole of Kansas

Voting
- Total delegates: 2,258
- Votes needed for nomination: 1,130
- Results (president): Ford (MI): 1,187 (52.57%); Reagan (CA): 1,070 (47.39%); Richardson (MA): 1 (0.04%)
- Results (vice president): Dole (KS): 1,921 (85.04%); Helms (NC): 103 (4.56%); Reagan (CA): 27 (1.20%); Crane (IL): 23 (1.02%); Others: 82 (3.62%); Abstentions: 103 (4.56%)
- Ballots: 1

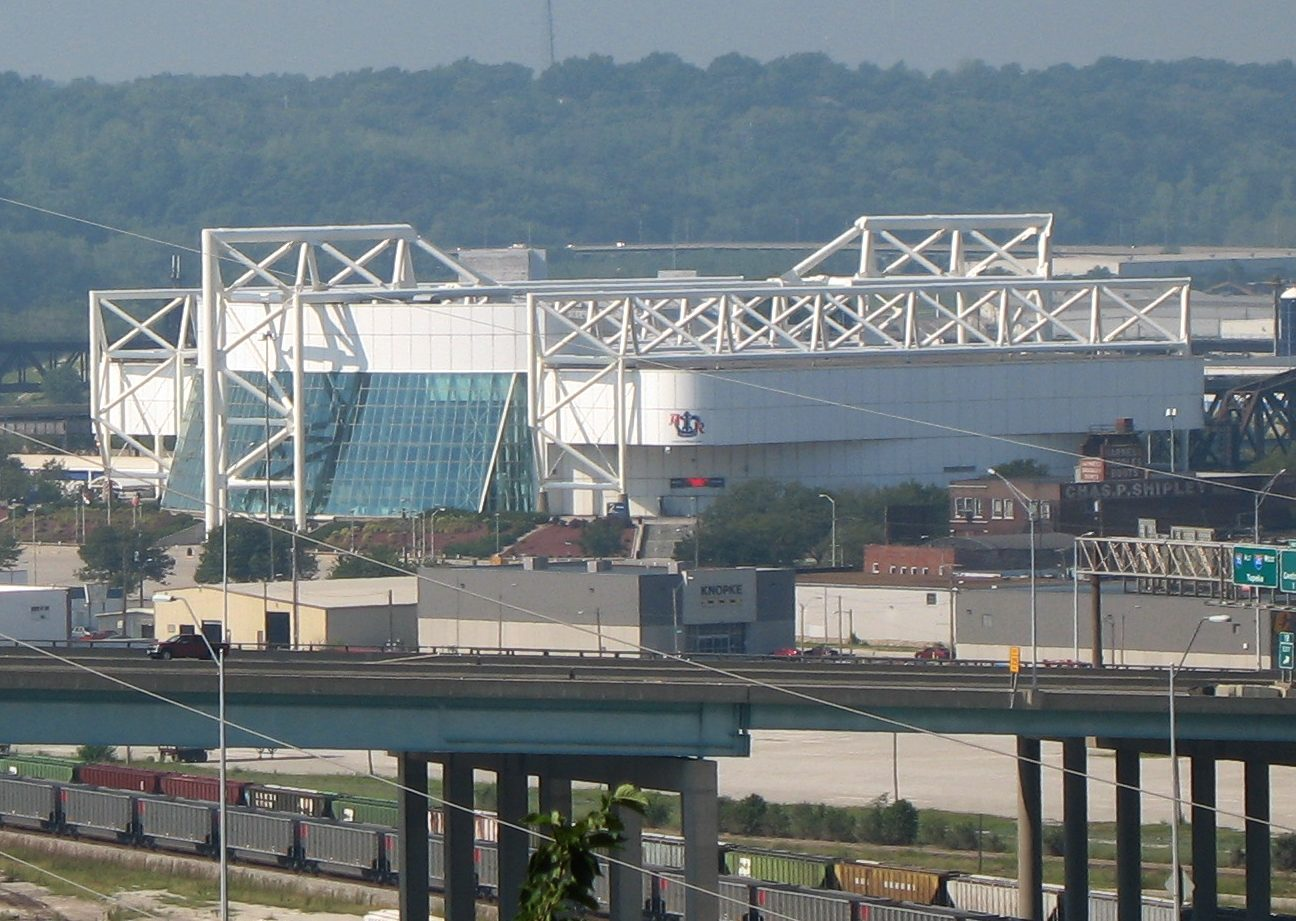
Kemper Arena, site of the 1976 Republican National Convention

The 1976 Republican National Convention was a United States political convention of the Republican Party that met from August 16 to August 19, 1976, to select the party's nominees for President of the United States and vice president. Held in Kemper Arena in Kansas City, Missouri, the Republican National Convention nominated President Gerald Ford for a full term, but only after narrowly defeating a strong challenge from former governor of California Ronald Reagan.

The convention nominated U.S. Senator Bob Dole from Kansas for vice president over incumbent Vice President Nelson Rockefeller, who did not seek nomination for a full term. The keynote address was delivered by Howard Baker, then a U.S. Senator from Tennessee. Other notable speakers included Minnesota Representative Al Quie, retired Lieutenant Colonel and former Vietnam War prisoner of war Raymond Schrump, former Democratic Texas Governor John Connally, Providence, Rhode Island mayor Vincent Cianci, and Michigan Senator Robert P. Griffin. It was the last national convention by either of the two major parties to feature a seriously contested nomination between candidates.

== History ==
Kansas City, Missouri had not hosted a major party convention since the 1928 Republican National Convention that nominated Herbert Hoover. Its premier venue, Kemper Arena, was diminutive by national standards but it was new, and the city aggressively courted the convention planners of both parties. The Democrats demurred early on, citing a lack of hotel accommodations, but Republicans were more receptive because the city had a reliably enthusiastic base of the party, and "fit the Midwestern image of Jerry Ford".

=== Situation at the opening of the convention ===
Going into the convention, Ford had won more primary delegates than Reagan, and also won a plurality in the popular vote. However, Ford did not have enough delegates to secure the nomination (1,130 delegates were needed to win the presidential nomination), and as the convention opened both candidates were seen as still having a chance to win. Because of this, both Ford and Reagan arrived in Kansas City before the convention opened to woo the remaining uncommitted delegates in an effort to secure the nomination.

Reagan benefited from his highly committed delegates, notably "Reagan's Raiders" of the Texas delegation. They and other conservative Western and Southern delegates particularly faulted the Ford Administration's foreign policy of détente towards the Soviet Union, criticizing his signing of the Helsinki Accords and indirectly blaming him for the April 1975 Fall of Saigon.

The pro-Reagan Texas delegates worked hard to persuade delegates from other states to support Reagan.

Ford, meanwhile, used all of the perks and patronage of the presidency to win over wavering delegates, including trips aboard Air Force One and personal meetings with Ford himself. White House Chief of Staff Dick Cheney proved to be an important figure in working to build support among those state delegations on the fence between Ford and Reagan, including the Mississippi delegation. White House political advisor Harry Dent also played a central role in helping President Ford work with the state delegations, who met with Ford and his aides in a presidential office set up on-site at the convention in Kansas City.

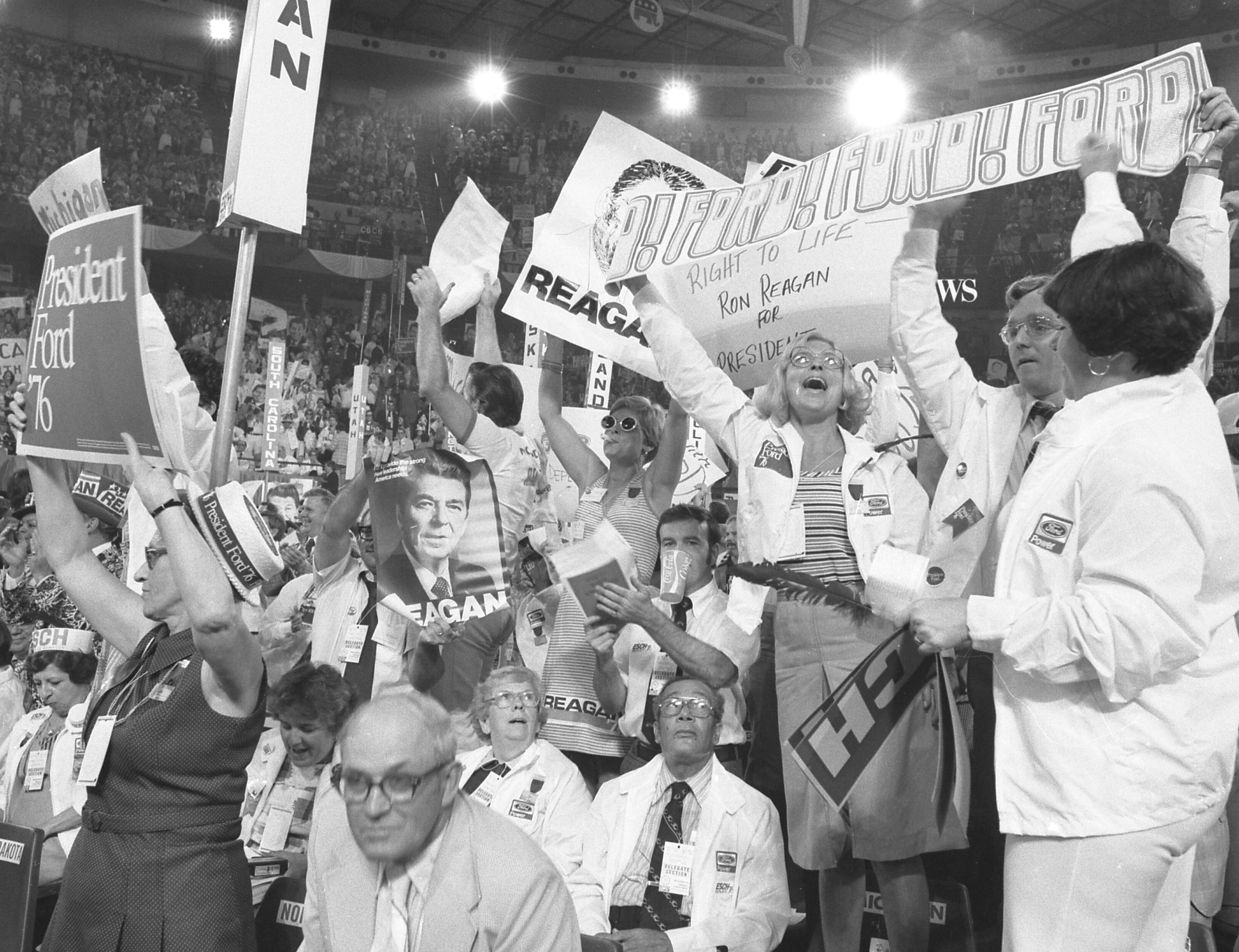
Michigan delegates waving signs for their candidates on day two of the convention.

Headlines during the Republican convention in Kansas City hinted at the still-simmering debates within the rank-and-file of the Republicans as to whether or not a new party might be formed out of the weaknesses of the Republicans. "Conservatives Seek a New Party if Reagan Loses," The Chicago Tribune's Wednesday, August 18, 1976, headlines told readers during the Kansas City convention, which quoted both White House aides as well as critics in the Republican Party who debated the possibility of a new party emerging out of that year's division in the Republican ranks.

Newspaper headlines also told the story of the uncommitted delegates whose "wavering" at the convention made them the focus of both the Ford and the Reagan camps. "New 'Stars' Stealing GOP Show," The Chicago Tribune's Wednesday, August 18, 1976, headlines told readers. Estimates ranged from 93 to as many as 115 delegates uncommitted at the time of the convention. The largest block of uncommitted delegates were from Mississippi and another block were from Illinois's delegation.

Wednesday, August 18, 1976, saw the uncommitted delegates break on the 1st ballot for President Gerald Ford, who won the nomination on the 1st roll call of delegates by a vote of 1,187-1,070.

=== Richard Schweiker gambit and the search for an alternative ===
Reagan had promised, if nominated, to name Senator Richard Schweiker of Pennsylvania as his running mate, in a bid to attract liberals and centrists in the party. This move backfired, however, as many conservatives (such as North Carolina Senator Jesse Helms) were infuriated by Reagan's choice of the "liberal" Schweiker, while few moderate delegates switched to Reagan. Helms promptly began a movement to draft Conservative Senator James L. Buckley of New York as the presidential nominee.

=== Platform and rules votes ===
The key vote of the convention occurred when Reagan's managers proposed a rules change that would have required Ford to publicly announce his running mate before the presidential balloting. Reagan's managers hoped that when Ford announced his choice for vice president, it would anger one of the two factions of the party and thus help Reagan. Ford's supporters derisively described the proposed rules change as the "misery loves company" amendment. The proposed rules change was defeated by a vote of 1180 to 1069, and Ford gained the momentum he needed to win the presidential nomination. The balloting was still close, however, as Ford won with 1187 votes to 1070 votes for Reagan (and one for Elliot Richardson of Massachusetts).

Conservatives succeeded in inserting several key planks into the party platform, some of which were implicitly critical of the President's own policies. Reagan and Senator Jesse Helms successfully had a "moral foreign policy" plank inserted. In light of the 1973 Roe v. Wade decision, the 1976 Republican platform became the first to advocate a Human Life Amendment to the Constitution, despite the fact that Roe v. Wade had been a 7–2 decision, and 5 of the 7 (Burger, Stewart, Brennan, Blackmun, and Powell) had been appointed to the Supreme Court by Republican presidents.

== Balloting ==
=== Presidential ===
First ballot vote for the presidential nomination by state delegations

RNC presidential nominee vote, 1976
Candidate	Votes	Percentage
Gerald Ford	1,187	52.57%
Ronald Reagan	1,070	47.39%
Elliot Richardson	1	0.04%
Totals	2,258	100.00%

=== Vice presidential ===
Ford selected Kansas Senator Robert J. Dole as his running mate, as unelected incumbent Vice President Rockefeller had announced the previous fall that he would not be a candidate for a full term in 1976.

After Ronald Reagan lost the presidential ballot to incumbent Gerald Ford, 103 of his delegates walked out of the convention, and the remainder decided to scatter their votes among 30 people. Bob Dole prevailed by an overwhelming margin.

- Bob Dole – 1,921 (85.04%)
- Jesse Helms – 103 (4.56%)
- Ronald Reagan – 27 (1.20%)
- Phil Crane – 23 (1.02%)
- John Grady – 19 (0.84%)
- Louis Frey Jr. – 9 (0.40%)
- Anne Armstrong – 6 (0.27%)
- Howard Baker – 6 (0.27%)
- William F. Buckley Jr. – 4 (0.18%)
- John Connally – 4 (0.18%)
- David C. Treen – 4 (0.18%)
- Alan Steelman – 3 (0.13%)
- Bob Bauman – 2 (0.09%)
- Bill Brock – 2 (0.09%)
- Paul Laxalt – 2 (0.09%)
- Elliot Richardson – 2 (0.09%)
- Richard Schweiker – 2 (0.09%)
- William E. Simon – 2 (0.09%)
- Jack Wellborn – 2 (0.09%)
- James Allen – 1 (0.04%)
- Ray Barnhardt – 1 (0.04%)
- George H. W. Bush – 1 (0.04%)
- Pete Domenici – 1 (0.04%)
- James B. Edwards – 1 (0.04%)
- Frank S. Glenn – 1 (0.04%)
- David Keene – 1 (0.04%)
- James McClure – 1 (0.04%)
- Nancy Palm – 1 (0.04%)
- Donald Rumsfeld – 1 (0.04%)
- John W. Sears – 1 (0.04%)
- Roger Staubach – 1 (0.04%)
- Steve Symms – 1 (0.04%)
- Abstaining – 103 (4.56%)

== Reagan's concession speech ==
Reagan's impromptu concession speech has been called a "defining moment of the Reagan Revolution."

There was no scheduled time slot for the runner-up to deliver a formal concession speech; however, when Ford and Reagan met on the dais after Ford's acceptance speech, the president insisted that the former governor accompany him to the podium to deliver a few remarks.

Reagan gave an eloquent and stirring speech that overshadowed Ford's own acceptance address, despite being little more than five minutes long. Some delegates later stated that they left the convention wondering if they had voted for the wrong candidate. A contemporary media account stated that if a motion to reconsider the nomination had been in order, it might have passed.

== Aftermath ==
Ford and Dole went on to lose to Jimmy Carter and Walter Mondale in the 1976 election. Reagan defeated Carter in the 1980 election to become president, and won again in 1984, beating Democratic challenger Mondale. Dole ran for president in 1980, 1988, and 1996, gaining the nomination the last time, but losing to Bill Clinton by a large margin.

== See also ==
- 1976 Republican Party presidential primaries
- History of the United States Republican Party
- List of Republican National Conventions
- United States presidential nominating convention
- 1976 Democratic National Convention
- 1976 United States presidential election
- Gerald Ford 1976 presidential campaign

Preceded by 1972; Miami Beach, Florida	Republican National Conventions	Succeeded by 1980; Detroit, Michigan
