= Ignoramus et ignorabimus =

Maxim about limits of scientific knowledge

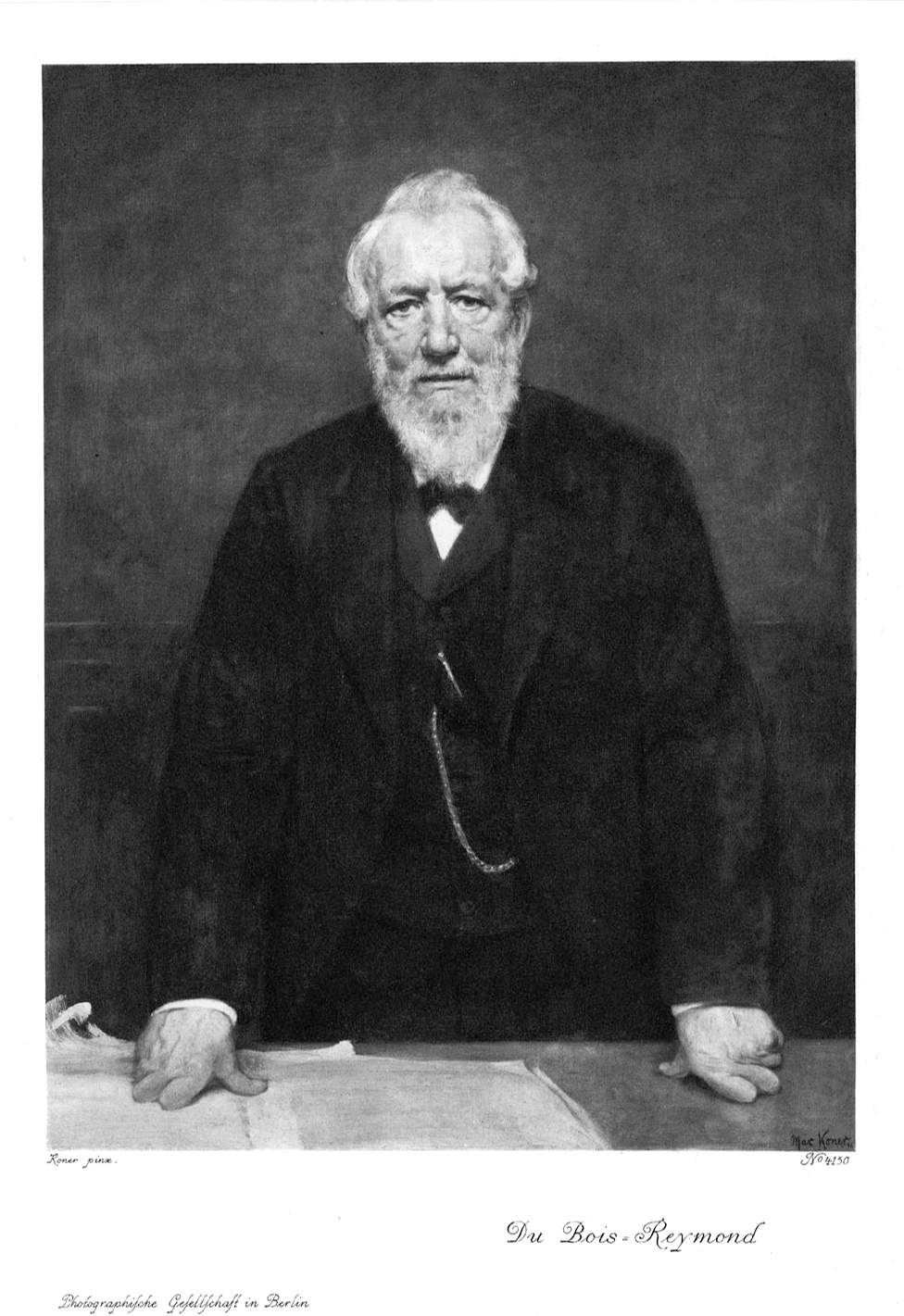
Emil du Bois-Reymond (1818–1896), promulgator of the maxim ignoramus et ignorabimus (Photogravure of a painting by Max Koner)

The Latin maxim ignoramus et ignorabimus, meaning "we do not know and will not know", represents the idea that scientific knowledge is limited. It was popularized by Emil du Bois-Reymond, a German physiologist, in his 1872 address "Über die Grenzen des Naturerkennens" ("The Limits of Science").

== Seven "World Riddles" ==
Emil du Bois-Reymond first used the words "ignoramus" and "ignorabimus" at the close of his keynote address to the 1872 Congress of German Scientists and Physicians. As he saw it, science was bounded by two limits: the ultimate nature of matter and the enigma of consciousness. Eight years later, in a speech before the Prussian Academy of Sciences, he expanded his list of conundrums to seven "world riddles" or "shortcomings" of science. Three of these he declared to be "transcendent", or permanently unknowable: "1. the ultimate nature of matter and energy, 2. the origin of motion, ... 5. the origin of simple sensations."

== Hilbert's reaction ==
David Hilbert, a widely respected German mathematician, suggested that such a conceptualization of human knowledge was too pessimistic, and that by considering questions unsolvable we limit our understanding.

In 1900, during an address to the International Congress of Mathematicians in Paris, Hilbert suggested that answers to problems of mathematics are possible with human effort. He declared, "in mathematics there is no ignorabimus", and he worked with other formalists to establish foundations for mathematics during the early 20th century.

On 8 September 1930, Hilbert elaborated his opinion in a celebrated address to the Society of German Scientists and Physicians, in Königsberg:

We must not believe those, who today, with philosophical bearing and deliberative tone, prophesy the fall of culture and accept the ignorabimus. For us there is no ignorabimus, and in my opinion none whatever in natural science. In opposition to the foolish ignorabimus our slogan shall be Wir müssen wissen – wir werden wissen ("We must know – we will know").

Answers to some of Hilbert's 23 problems were found during the 20th century. Some have been answered definitively; some have not yet been solved; a few, most notably Cantor's continuum hypothesis, have been shown to be undecidable on the basis of currently accepted principles.

In 1931, Gödel's incompleteness theorems showed that for any formal system of mathematics satisfying certain minimal requirements, there exist questions that cannot be answered within that system. While this does not exclude that the question can be answered unambiguously in another system, the incompleteness theorems are generally taken to imply that Hilbert's hopes for proving the consistency of mathematics using purely finitistic methods were unfounded. As this excludes the possibility of an absolute proof of consistency, there must always remain an ineliminable degree of insecurity about the foundations of mathematics: we will never be capable of knowing, once and for all, with a certainty unimpeachable even by the most stout skepticism, that there is no contradiction in our basic theories. (Note that this does not mean that such skepticism is rational; it only means that it cannot be refuted with absolute rigour.)

== Other responses ==
The sociologist Wolf Lepenies discussed the Ignorabimus with the opinion that du Bois-Reymond was not really pessimistic about science:

... it is in fact an incredibly self-confident support for scientific hubris masked as modesty ...

This was in regards to Friedrich Wolters, one of the members of the literary group "George-Kreis". Lepenies thought that Wolters misunderstood the degree of pessimism being expressed about science, but understood the implication that scientists themselves could be trusted with self-criticism.

Lepenies was repeating the criticism, first leveled in 1874 by du Bois-Reymond's rival Ernst Haeckel, that the "seemingly humble but actually presumptuous Ignorabimus is the Ignoratis of the infallible Vatican and of the 'Black International' which it heads." Haeckel overstated his charge: du Bois-Reymond had never supported the Catholic Church, and far from professing humility he reminded his audience that while our knowledge was indeed bounded by mysteries of matter and mind, within these limits "the man of science is lord and master; he can analyze and synthesize, and no one can fathom the extent of his knowledge and power".

In response to his critics du Bois-Reymond modified his watchword in "The Seven World Riddles" (1880) to that of "Dubitemus" ("We doubt it.")

William James referred to "Ignoramus, ignorabimus" in his lecture "Reflex Action and Theism" (1881) as an expression of agnosticism, which gives man no practical tools for his volitions. James had attended du Bois-Reymond's lectures in Berlin.

The Quarterly Review also regarded the maxim as the ensign of agnosticism:

To the average citizen who reads as he runs, and who is unacquainted with any tongue save his native British, it may well appear that the Gospel of Unbelief, preached among us during the last half-century, has had its four Evangelists–the Quadrilateral, as they have been called, whose works and outworks, demilunes and frowning bastions, take the public eye, while above them floats the agnostic banner with its strange device, "Ignoramus et Ignorabimus."

The issue of whether science has limits continues to attract scholarly attention.

== See also ==
- Acatalepsy
- Hubris
- I know that I know nothing
- Ignorance management
- Ignotum per ignotius
- List of Latin phrases
- Strong agnosticism
- Unknowability
