= Plain English Campaign =

Firm in the United Kingdom

The Plain English Campaign (PEC) is a commercial editing and training firm based in the United Kingdom. Founded in 1979 by Chrissie Maher, the company is concerned with plain English language advocacy, working to persuade organisations in the UK and abroad to communicate with the public in plain language. Maher was awarded the Order of the British Empire in 1994 for her services to plain communication.

In 1990, PEC created the Crystal Mark, its seal of approval. This is a symbol printed on documents that it considers to be as clear as possible for the intended audience. The symbol appears on over 20,000 documents worldwide. They also give out the annual Foot in Mouth Award for "a baffling comment by a public figure" and the Golden Bull Award for "the worst examples of written tripe". Notable winners of the Foot in Mouth Award include Donald Trump, George W. Bush, Gordon Brown, Richard Gere, and Donald Rumsfeld.

PEC has worked all over the world for companies and organisations including British Gas, British Telecom, Irish Life, Telefónica O2 and the World Bowls association. It has also worked with the majority of UK council and government departments. Many UK forms and bills carry the Crystal Mark, including the British passport application form.

PEC is often described in the media as a pressure group, and regularly makes public comments about language-related news stories, particularly jargon. In 2008 it criticised a consultation document sent to residents living near Heathrow Airport. The year before, it mocked signs put up by police in Hertfordshire that warned the public not to commit crime.

In 2006 its supporters voted Bill Shankly the author of the greatest footballing quotation of all time: "Some people believe football is a matter of life and death. I'm very disappointed with that attitude. I can assure you it is much, much more important than that." A 2004 survey revealed that "At the end of the day" was considered the most irritating cliché.

Famous supporters of PEC include Margaret Thatcher and broadcaster John Humphrys.

PEC has been criticised by writer Oliver Kamm, who wrote: "The joke – not that it's funny – is that a body ostensibly concerned with clarity of language is both incompetent in its own use of English and heedless of the task it sets itself."

A different point of view was given by Tom McArthur, editor of The Oxford Companion to the English Language, who said: "In all the history of the language, there has never been such a powerful grassroots movement to influence it as Plain English Campaign."

In 2011 PEC criticised the Met Office for using the phrase "probabilities of precipitation" instead of "rain is likely". The Met Office responded by explaining that precipitation does not mean only rain. A Met Office spokesman said: "Precipitation covers a wide range of stuff falling from the sky including rain, sleet, snow, hail, drizzle, and even cats and dogs – but sums it up in just one word."

== See also ==
- Plain English
- Simple English Wikipedia
- Simplified English
- Foot in Mouth Award
- Anglish
- List of Germanic and Latinate equivalents in English
