= Nancy Palm =

American activist of the Republican Party

Nancy Gene Palm (née Dale; April 14, 1921 – February 15, 2011) was a longtime Republican Party activist, primarily known as the chairwoman of the Harris County, Texas Republican Party during the 1970s. She received a single vote to be the nominee for Vice President of the United States at the 1976 Republican National Convention.

Palm was born in Nashville, Tennessee and attended West End High School. She graduated from Vanderbilt University in 1942. Palm cast her first vote in 1944 for Franklin D. Roosevelt. She married William Morrison Palm in July 1942 and they moved to Houston, Texas in 1951. There, Palm became active and though she initially worked on behalf of both Democratic and Republican candidates, she drifted towards full affiliation with the Republican Party. In 1967, she was selected as the chair of the Harris County Republican Party.

In 1972 she was a delegate to the Republican National Convention; at the following 1976 Republican National Convention Palm became one of just three women to have received an unsuccessful nomination for Vice President within the Republican Party. She was credited with helping to create the Republican Party of Texas. Palm was one of the electors from Texas for the 2000 presidential election. In 2002 she was an honoree of the League of Women Voters of Houston, Texas and the county government designated a day in her favor, along with her counterpart Democratic Billie Carr.
