= Ignotum per ignotius =

Explanation unhelpful due to its unfamiliarity

Ignotum per ignotius (Latin for "the unknown by the more unknown") describes an explanation that is less familiar than the concept it would explain.

An example would be: "The oven felt hot because of Fourier's law." It is unlikely that a person unfamiliar with the hotness of ovens would be enlightened by a reference to a fundamental law of physics.

That said, since these explanations could enlighten people in theory, ignotum per ignotius is not strictly a fallacy, but a criticism of an argument on rhetorical grounds, stating that such an argument is not useful in a particular context.

== Ignotum per æque ignotum ==
Ignotum per æque ignotum, meaning "the unknown by the equally unknown", is a related form of fallacy in which one attempts to prove something unknown by deducing it from something else that is also not known to be true.

== Τό ἧττον ἄπορον διά τοῦ μείζονος ἀπόρου ==
Τὸ ἧττον ἄπορον διὰ τοῦ μείζονος ἀπόρου (Ancient Greek for "the less doubtful by the more doubtful") found in Sextus Empiricus (Against the Physicists. Against the ethicists, I, 34) when he comments on Democritus's views concerning the conception of God. In the translation of the original text in English by R. G. Bury, the word "ἄπορον" is translated as "doubtful" is utmost misleading, as one can find that the word ἄπορος • (áporos) m or f (neuter ἄπορον) from ἀ- (a-, “not”) + πόρος (póros, “passage”) simply means:

1. without passage, impassable, having no way through
2. hard, difficult
3. (of people) hard to deal with, unmanageable
4. not knowing what to do, at a loss
5. poor, needy

and not "doubtful" .

One can also find the refutation, that the Pyrrhonian sceptic doesn't doubt, at Henrik Langerlund's book Skepticism in Philosophy, A Comprehensive, Historical Introduction (2020).

As Benson Mates points out in the introduction to his translation of the Outlines, this might seem like too fine a point, but it is extremely important for a proper understanding of Sextus’ version of skepticism. ‘Doubt’ implies an understanding of what it is you are doubting. To use Mates’s example, I cannot doubt that 8 is a prime number unless I already know what a prime number is, but I can be at a loss without having to understand or even know anything. This distinction is crucial for Sextus. I can be at a loss without giving any assertion to something being the case, whereas ‘doubt’ cannot be used in this way.

The confusion of these terms seems to have started from the first translation of Sextus in 1562 by Henri Estienne, also known as Henrico Stephano. He translated the aforementioned sentence as follows:

Democritus autem non est fide dignus, qui minus dubium docet per maius.

== See also ==
- List of Latin phrases
