= Johari window =

Technique in personality development

Johari window

The Johari window is a technique designed to help people better understand their relationship with themselves and others. It was created by psychologists Joseph Luft (1916–2014) and Harrington Ingham (1916–1995) in 1955, and is used primarily in self-help groups and corporate settings as a heuristic exercise. Luft and Ingham named their model "Johari" using a combination of their first names.

== The four quadrants ==
(terms as depicted in the graphic)

Open (Arena)
The open quadrant refers to behavior, feelings, and motivation known to self and to others.

Blind (Blind spot)
The blind quadrant refers to behavior, feelings, and motivation known to others but not to self.

Hidden (Facade)
The hidden quadrant refers to behavior, feelings, and motivation known to self but not to others.

Unknown (Unknown)
The unknown quadrant refers to behavior, feelings, and motivation known neither to self nor to others.

== Therapy ==
One therapeutic target may be the expansion of the Open (Arena) square at the expense of both the Unknown square and the Blind (Blind Spot) square, resulting in greater knowledge of oneself, while voluntary disclosure of Hidden (Facade) or Blind (Blind Spot) squares may result in greater interpersonal intimacy and friendship.

== See also ==
- Assertiveness – Capacity of being self-assured without being aggressive to defend a point of view
- Shadow – Concept in Jungian psychology
- "There are unknown unknowns"
