= Moral intellectualism =

View in meta-ethics

Moral intellectualism or ethical intellectualism is a view in meta-ethics according to which genuine moral knowledge must take the form of arriving at discursive moral judgements about what one should do. One way of understanding this is that doing what is right is a reflection of what any being knows is right. However, it can also be interpreted as the understanding that a rationally consistent worldview and theoretical way of life, as exemplified by Socrates, is superior to the life devoted to a moral (but merely practical) life.

== Ancient moral intellectualism ==
For Socrates (469–399 BC), intellectualism is the view that "one will do what is right or best just as soon as one truly understands what is right or best"; that virtue is a purely intellectual matter, since virtue and knowledge are cerebral relatives, which a person accrues and improves with dedication to reason. So defined, Socratic intellectualism became a key philosophical doctrine of Stoicism. The Stoics are well known for their teaching that the good is to be identified with virtue.

The apparent, problematic consequences of this view are "Socratic paradoxes", such as the view that there is no weakness of will (that no one knowingly does, or knowingly seeks to do, what is morally wrong); that anyone who does, or seeks to do, moral wrong does so involuntarily; and that since virtue is knowledge, there cannot be many different virtues such as those defended by Aristotle, and instead, all virtues must be one. The following are among the so-called Socratic paradoxes:

- No one desires evil.
- No one errs or does wrong willingly or knowingly.
- Virtue – all virtue – is knowledge.
- Virtue is sufficient for happiness.

However, it is clear in Meno that virtue is not knowledge, rather True Belief.

Typically, Stoic accounts of care for the self required specific ascetic exercises meant to ensure that not only was knowledge of truth memorized, but learned, and then integrated to the self, in the course of transforming oneself into a good person. Therefore, to understand truth meant "intellectual knowledge", requiring one's integration to the (universal) truth, and authentically living it in one's speech, heart, and conduct. Achieving that difficult task required continual care of the self, but also meant being someone who embodies truth, and so can readily practice the Classical-era rhetorical device of parrhesia: "to speak candidly, and to ask forgiveness for so speaking"; and, by extension, practice the moral obligation to speak the truth, even at personal risk.

== Contemporary views ==
Contemporary philosophers dispute that Socrates's conceptions of knowing truth, and of ethical conduct, can be equated with modern, post-Cartesian conceptions of knowledge and of rational intellectualism.

== See also ==
- Moral rationalism
